This is a partial list of unnumbered minor planets for principal provisional designations assigned during 1–15 August 2002. , a total of 618 bodies remain unnumbered for this period. Objects for this year are listed on the following pages: A–B · C · D–F · G–K · L–O · P · Qi · Qii · Ri · Rii · S · Ti · Tii · U–V and W–Y. Also see previous and next year.

P 

|- id="2002 PB" bgcolor=#FFC2E0
| 3 || 2002 PB || APO || 20.5 || data-sort-value="0.28" | 280 m || multiple || 2002–2020 || 18 Nov 2020 || 93 || align=left | Disc.: LINEAR || 
|- id="2002 PN" bgcolor=#FFC2E0
| 3 || 2002 PN || APO || 24.8 || data-sort-value="0.039" | 39 m || single || 249 days || 08 Apr 2003 || 131 || align=left | Disc.: Desert Wanderer Obs. || 
|- id="2002 PU" bgcolor=#d6d6d6
| 2 || 2002 PU || MBA-O || 17.6 || 1.7 km || multiple || 2002–2019 || 02 Jan 2019 || 53 || align=left | Disc.: NEAT || 
|- id="2002 PW" bgcolor=#d6d6d6
| 0 || 2002 PW || MBA-O || 15.6 || 4.2 km || multiple || 1997–2019 || 20 Dec 2019 || 257 || align=left | Disc.: LINEAR || 
|- id="2002 PD1" bgcolor=#FA8072
| 0 ||  || MCA || 18.62 || data-sort-value="0.56" | 560 m || multiple || 2002–2022 || 27 Jan 2022 || 114 || align=left | Disc.: NEATAlt.: 2013 AX15 || 
|- id="2002 PE1" bgcolor=#FA8072
| 3 ||  || MCA || 19.8 || data-sort-value="0.33" | 330 m || multiple || 2002–2016 || 22 Oct 2016 || 28 || align=left | Disc.: NEATAlt.: 2016 TS93 || 
|- id="2002 PN1" bgcolor=#d6d6d6
| 0 ||  || MBA-O || 16.8 || 2.4 km || multiple || 2002–2020 || 10 Dec 2020 || 81 || align=left | Disc.: NEAT || 
|- id="2002 PR1" bgcolor=#FFC2E0
| 5 ||  || AMO || 21.9 || data-sort-value="0.15" | 150 m || single || 88 days || 31 Oct 2002 || 99 || align=left | Disc.: NEATPotentially hazardous object || 
|- id="2002 PD2" bgcolor=#E9E9E9
| 0 ||  || MBA-M || 17.0 || 1.7 km || multiple || 1998–2021 || 11 Jan 2021 || 157 || align=left | Disc.: NEAT || 
|- id="2002 PJ2" bgcolor=#d6d6d6
| 0 ||  || MBA-O || 16.3 || 3.1 km || multiple || 2002–2021 || 11 Jan 2021 || 96 || align=left | Disc.: NEATAlt.: 2014 WN184 || 
|- id="2002 PJ3" bgcolor=#d6d6d6
| 1 ||  || MBA-O || 16.7 || 2.5 km || multiple || 2002–2018 || 08 Nov 2018 || 85 || align=left | Disc.: NEAT || 
|- id="2002 PN3" bgcolor=#E9E9E9
| 0 ||  || MBA-M || 17.2 || 1.1 km || multiple || 2002–2021 || 16 Jan 2021 || 109 || align=left | Disc.: NEAT || 
|- id="2002 PB4" bgcolor=#E9E9E9
| 0 ||  || MBA-M || 16.78 || 1.3 km || multiple || 2002–2021 || 02 May 2021 || 162 || align=left | Disc.: NEAT || 
|- id="2002 PJ5" bgcolor=#d6d6d6
| 0 ||  || MBA-O || 16.01 || 3.5 km || multiple || 2002–2021 || 13 May 2021 || 245 || align=left | Disc.: NEATAlt.: 2011 HN17, 2011 HO20 || 
|- id="2002 PP5" bgcolor=#E9E9E9
| 0 ||  || MBA-M || 17.62 || 1.7 km || multiple || 1998–2022 || 25 Jan 2022 || 92 || align=left | Disc.: NEAT || 
|- id="2002 PW5" bgcolor=#d6d6d6
| 0 ||  || MBA-O || 16.45 || 2.9 km || multiple || 2002–2022 || 26 Jan 2022 || 141 || align=left | Disc.: NEAT || 
|- id="2002 PX5" bgcolor=#d6d6d6
| 1 ||  || MBA-O || 17.2 || 2.0 km || multiple || 2002–2020 || 24 Jan 2020 || 85 || align=left | Disc.: NEAT || 
|- id="2002 PC6" bgcolor=#E9E9E9
| 0 ||  || MBA-M || 17.5 || data-sort-value="0.94" | 940 m || multiple || 1994–2020 || 31 Jan 2020 || 65 || align=left | Disc.: CINEOS || 
|- id="2002 PE6" bgcolor=#d6d6d6
| 0 ||  || MBA-O || 17.0 || 2.2 km || multiple || 2002–2019 || 01 Nov 2019 || 75 || align=left | Disc.: CINEOS || 
|- id="2002 PL6" bgcolor=#FA8072
| 0 ||  || MCA || 17.4 || 1.4 km || multiple || 2002–2019 || 29 Aug 2019 || 202 || align=left | Disc.: LINEAR || 
|- id="2002 PN6" bgcolor=#FFC2E0
| 1 ||  || AMO || 20.9 || data-sort-value="0.23" | 230 m || multiple || 2002–2009 || 19 Dec 2009 || 65 || align=left | Disc.: NEAT || 
|- id="2002 PO6" bgcolor=#FFC2E0
| 2 ||  || AMO || 20.7 || data-sort-value="0.26" | 260 m || multiple || 2002–2012 || 27 Jul 2012 || 32 || align=left | Disc.: NEAT || 
|- id="2002 PQ6" bgcolor=#FFC2E0
| 4 ||  || AMO || 20.4 || data-sort-value="0.30" | 300 m || single || 125 days || 12 Nov 2002 || 128 || align=left | Disc.: NEAT || 
|- id="2002 PU6" bgcolor=#fefefe
| 1 ||  || MBA-I || 18.4 || data-sort-value="0.62" | 620 m || multiple || 2002–2019 || 02 Nov 2019 || 61 || align=left | Disc.: NEAT || 
|- id="2002 PW6" bgcolor=#d6d6d6
| 0 ||  || MBA-O || 16.4 || 2.9 km || multiple || 2002–2019 || 01 Nov 2019 || 75 || align=left | Disc.: NEAT || 
|- id="2002 PX6" bgcolor=#fefefe
| 0 ||  || MBA-I || 18.0 || data-sort-value="0.75" | 750 m || multiple || 1995–2020 || 14 Oct 2020 || 48 || align=left | Disc.: NEAT || 
|- id="2002 PY6" bgcolor=#E9E9E9
| 0 ||  || MBA-M || 17.3 || 1.5 km || multiple || 2002–2017 || 27 Jan 2017 || 92 || align=left | Disc.: NEATAlt.: 2011 WO151 || 
|- id="2002 PB7" bgcolor=#d6d6d6
| 2 ||  || MBA-O || 18.3 || 1.2 km || multiple || 2002–2014 || 31 May 2014 || 34 || align=left | Disc.: NEAT || 
|- id="2002 PC7" bgcolor=#E9E9E9
| 1 ||  || MBA-M || 18.0 || data-sort-value="0.75" | 750 m || multiple || 2002–2018 || 10 Jul 2018 || 63 || align=left | Disc.: NEAT || 
|- id="2002 PE7" bgcolor=#fefefe
| 0 ||  || MBA-I || 18.2 || data-sort-value="0.68" | 680 m || multiple || 2002–2021 || 15 Jan 2021 || 71 || align=left | Disc.: NEAT || 
|- id="2002 PH7" bgcolor=#E9E9E9
| 0 ||  || MBA-M || 18.1 || 1.0 km || multiple || 2002–2019 || 20 Aug 2019 || 54 || align=left | Disc.: NEAT || 
|- id="2002 PJ7" bgcolor=#d6d6d6
| 0 ||  || MBA-O || 16.97 || 2.2 km || multiple || 2002–2021 || 15 Jan 2021 || 137 || align=left | Disc.: NEAT || 
|- id="2002 PL7" bgcolor=#E9E9E9
| 0 ||  || MBA-M || 17.7 || 1.2 km || multiple || 2002–2019 || 22 Jul 2019 || 90 || align=left | Disc.: NEATAlt.: 2015 PD310 || 
|- id="2002 PN7" bgcolor=#E9E9E9
| 0 ||  || MBA-M || 16.6 || 1.4 km || multiple || 2002–2021 || 17 Jan 2021 || 176 || align=left | Disc.: NEAT || 
|- id="2002 PR7" bgcolor=#fefefe
| 0 ||  || MBA-I || 18.27 || data-sort-value="0.66" | 660 m || multiple || 2002–2021 || 20 Nov 2021 || 157 || align=left | Disc.: NEATAlt.: 2013 LF3 || 
|- id="2002 PS7" bgcolor=#FA8072
| 0 ||  || MCA || 18.3 || data-sort-value="0.65" | 650 m || multiple || 1995–2020 || 07 Dec 2020 || 124 || align=left | Disc.: NEAT || 
|- id="2002 PT7" bgcolor=#E9E9E9
| 1 ||  || MBA-M || 17.8 || data-sort-value="0.82" | 820 m || multiple || 1998–2020 || 04 Jan 2020 || 50 || align=left | Disc.: NEAT || 
|- id="2002 PF8" bgcolor=#fefefe
| 0 ||  || HUN || 18.56 || data-sort-value="0.58" | 580 m || multiple || 2002–2021 || 18 Nov 2021 || 122 || align=left | Disc.: NEAT || 
|- id="2002 PO8" bgcolor=#E9E9E9
| 0 ||  || MBA-M || 17.36 || 1.0 km || multiple || 2002–2021 || 09 Apr 2021 || 232 || align=left | Disc.: NEAT || 
|- id="2002 PS8" bgcolor=#E9E9E9
| 0 ||  || MBA-M || 17.5 || 1.3 km || multiple || 2002–2020 || 19 Jan 2020 || 251 || align=left | Disc.: NEAT || 
|- id="2002 PY8" bgcolor=#fefefe
| 1 ||  || MBA-I || 17.7 || data-sort-value="0.86" | 860 m || multiple || 2002–2019 || 09 Jan 2019 || 36 || align=left | Disc.: NEAT || 
|- id="2002 PY9" bgcolor=#fefefe
| 1 ||  || MBA-I || 18.5 || data-sort-value="0.59" | 590 m || multiple || 2002–2019 || 20 Dec 2019 || 62 || align=left | Disc.: NEATAlt.: 2012 RW32 || 
|- id="2002 PK10" bgcolor=#E9E9E9
| 0 ||  || MBA-M || 17.1 || 2.6 km || multiple || 2002–2020 || 11 Nov 2020 || 97 || align=left | Disc.: NEATAlt.: 2010 KW124 || 
|- id="2002 PC11" bgcolor=#FFC2E0
| 1 ||  || AMO || 19.8 || data-sort-value="0.39" | 390 m || multiple || 2002–2015 || 12 Jul 2015 || 156 || align=left | Disc.: NEAT || 
|- id="2002 PD11" bgcolor=#FFC2E0
| 5 ||  || APO || 20.1 || data-sort-value="0.34" | 340 m || single || 37 days || 28 Aug 2002 || 71 || align=left | Disc.: NEAT || 
|- id="2002 PH11" bgcolor=#fefefe
| 1 ||  || MBA-I || 18.2 || data-sort-value="0.68" | 680 m || multiple || 2002–2020 || 08 Dec 2020 || 85 || align=left | Disc.: CINEOS || 
|- id="2002 PG12" bgcolor=#d6d6d6
| 0 ||  || MBA-O || 16.53 || 2.8 km || multiple || 2001–2021 || 12 May 2021 || 113 || align=left | Disc.: NEAT || 
|- id="2002 PM14" bgcolor=#E9E9E9
| 0 ||  || MBA-M || 16.7 || 1.4 km || multiple || 2002–2020 || 26 Jan 2020 || 118 || align=left | Disc.: NEAT || 
|- id="2002 PU15" bgcolor=#E9E9E9
| 0 ||  || MBA-M || 17.5 || 1.3 km || multiple || 1998–2020 || 20 Oct 2020 || 152 || align=left | Disc.: NEATAlt.: 2015 FS334 || 
|- id="2002 PJ16" bgcolor=#E9E9E9
| 0 ||  || MBA-M || 17.8 || 1.2 km || multiple || 1993–2020 || 24 Dec 2020 || 111 || align=left | Disc.: NEAT || 
|- id="2002 PZ16" bgcolor=#E9E9E9
| 1 ||  || MBA-M || 17.8 || 1.2 km || multiple || 2002–2015 || 14 Sep 2015 || 60 || align=left | Disc.: NEATAlt.: 2007 WZ42, 2011 UG110 || 
|- id="2002 PE17" bgcolor=#fefefe
| 0 ||  || MBA-I || 17.7 || data-sort-value="0.86" | 860 m || multiple || 2002–2020 || 08 Oct 2020 || 161 || align=left | Disc.: NEAT || 
|- id="2002 PL17" bgcolor=#E9E9E9
| 1 ||  || MBA-M || 17.0 || 1.2 km || multiple || 2002–2020 || 24 Jan 2020 || 64 || align=left | Disc.: NEAT || 
|- id="2002 PR17" bgcolor=#E9E9E9
| 0 ||  || MBA-M || 16.30 || 2.3 km || multiple || 2002–2022 || 10 Jan 2022 || 226 || align=left | Disc.: NEATAlt.: 2011 QF31 || 
|- id="2002 PV17" bgcolor=#E9E9E9
| 0 ||  || MBA-M || 16.84 || 2.4 km || multiple || 2002–2021 || 30 Oct 2021 || 184 || align=left | Disc.: NEATAlt.: 2010 HE98 || 
|- id="2002 PF19" bgcolor=#d6d6d6
| 0 ||  || MBA-O || 16.2 || 3.2 km || multiple || 2002–2021 || 18 Jan 2021 || 120 || align=left | Disc.: NEAT || 
|- id="2002 PH19" bgcolor=#fefefe
| 0 ||  || MBA-I || 18.1 || data-sort-value="0.71" | 710 m || multiple || 2002–2019 || 04 Oct 2019 || 115 || align=left | Disc.: NEAT || 
|- id="2002 PU19" bgcolor=#d6d6d6
| 0 ||  || MBA-O || 16.64 || 2.6 km || multiple || 2000–2021 || 15 Apr 2021 || 119 || align=left | Disc.: NEAT || 
|- id="2002 PC20" bgcolor=#E9E9E9
| 0 ||  || MBA-M || 17.3 || 1.0 km || multiple || 2002–2020 || 26 Jan 2020 || 115 || align=left | Disc.: NEAT || 
|- id="2002 PD20" bgcolor=#E9E9E9
| 0 ||  || MBA-M || 17.07 || 1.6 km || multiple || 1997–2022 || 08 Jan 2022 || 163 || align=left | Disc.: NEATAlt.: 2015 TL33 || 
|- id="2002 PM20" bgcolor=#E9E9E9
| 0 ||  || MBA-M || 17.2 || 1.5 km || multiple || 2002–2019 || 17 Nov 2019 || 171 || align=left | Disc.: NEATAlt.: 2011 UR240 || 
|- id="2002 PH21" bgcolor=#fefefe
| 0 ||  || MBA-I || 18.0 || data-sort-value="0.75" | 750 m || multiple || 2002–2019 || 01 Aug 2019 || 105 || align=left | Disc.: NEAT || 
|- id="2002 PW21" bgcolor=#E9E9E9
| 0 ||  || MBA-M || 17.5 || 1.3 km || multiple || 2002–2021 || 15 Jan 2021 || 175 || align=left | Disc.: NEATAlt.: 2015 TO292 || 
|- id="2002 PH22" bgcolor=#E9E9E9
| 0 ||  || MBA-M || 17.6 || data-sort-value="0.90" | 900 m || multiple || 2002–2020 || 26 Jan 2020 || 122 || align=left | Disc.: NEAT || 
|- id="2002 PF23" bgcolor=#fefefe
| 0 ||  || MBA-I || 18.3 || data-sort-value="0.65" | 650 m || multiple || 2002–2020 || 10 Oct 2020 || 141 || align=left | Disc.: NEAT || 
|- id="2002 PV23" bgcolor=#FA8072
| 2 ||  || MCA || 19.3 || data-sort-value="0.41" | 410 m || multiple || 2002–2019 || 27 Oct 2019 || 38 || align=left | Disc.: NEAT || 
|- id="2002 PX25" bgcolor=#FA8072
| 2 ||  || MCA || 19.2 || data-sort-value="0.43" | 430 m || multiple || 2002–2019 || 03 Dec 2019 || 59 || align=left | Disc.: NEAT || 
|- id="2002 PP28" bgcolor=#fefefe
| 0 ||  || MBA-I || 17.9 || data-sort-value="0.78" | 780 m || multiple || 2002–2020 || 10 Dec 2020 || 127 || align=left | Disc.: NEAT || 
|- id="2002 PE31" bgcolor=#d6d6d6
| 0 ||  || MBA-O || 16.03 || 3.5 km || multiple || 2002–2021 || 03 May 2021 || 193 || align=left | Disc.: NEAT || 
|- id="2002 PU31" bgcolor=#fefefe
| 2 ||  || MBA-I || 18.5 || data-sort-value="0.59" | 590 m || multiple || 2002–2018 || 05 Nov 2018 || 117 || align=left | Disc.: NEAT || 
|- id="2002 PA32" bgcolor=#fefefe
| 0 ||  || MBA-I || 18.96 || data-sort-value="0.48" | 480 m || multiple || 1999–2021 || 09 Jul 2021 || 106 || align=left | Disc.: NEAT || 
|- id="2002 PH32" bgcolor=#E9E9E9
| 0 ||  || MBA-M || 17.2 || 1.1 km || multiple || 1998–2021 || 15 Jan 2021 || 170 || align=left | Disc.: NEATAlt.: 2010 LZ15 || 
|- id="2002 PK34" bgcolor=#E9E9E9
| 0 ||  || MBA-M || 16.6 || 2.0 km || multiple || 1981–2021 || 17 Jan 2021 || 207 || align=left | Disc.: NEATAlt.: 2017 BZ49 || 
|- id="2002 PL34" bgcolor=#d6d6d6
| 0 ||  || MBA-O || 16.45 || 2.9 km || multiple || 2002–2022 || 24 Jan 2022 || 76 || align=left | Disc.: NEAT || 
|- id="2002 PS34" bgcolor=#E9E9E9
| 0 ||  || MBA-M || 17.6 || 1.3 km || multiple || 2002–2021 || 11 Jan 2021 || 120 || align=left | Disc.: CINEOS || 
|- id="2002 PT36" bgcolor=#E9E9E9
| 0 ||  || MBA-M || 16.89 || 2.3 km || multiple || 2002–2021 || 28 Nov 2021 || 114 || align=left | Disc.: NEAT || 
|- id="2002 PV36" bgcolor=#d6d6d6
| 0 ||  || MBA-O || 17.52 || 1.7 km || multiple || 2002–2021 || 14 Apr 2021 || 88 || align=left | Disc.: NEATAlt.: 2017 PO10 || 
|- id="2002 PZ36" bgcolor=#E9E9E9
| 0 ||  || MBA-M || 16.91 || 1.2 km || multiple || 2002–2021 || 09 Apr 2021 || 256 || align=left | Disc.: LINEAR || 
|- id="2002 PA37" bgcolor=#E9E9E9
| 0 ||  || MBA-M || 17.55 || 1.7 km || multiple || 2002–2021 || 05 Dec 2021 || 143 || align=left | Disc.: LINEAR || 
|- id="2002 PW39" bgcolor=#FFC2E0
| 5 ||  || AMO || 21.2 || data-sort-value="0.20" | 200 m || single || 59 days || 04 Oct 2002 || 24 || align=left | Disc.: NEAT || 
|- id="2002 PX39" bgcolor=#FFC2E0
| 3 ||  || APO || 23.4 || data-sort-value="0.074" | 74 m || single || 40 days || 04 Sep 2002 || 55 || align=left | Disc.: NEAT || 
|- id="2002 PY39" bgcolor=#FFC2E0
| 4 ||  || AMO || 21.5 || data-sort-value="0.18" | 180 m || single || 145 days || 31 Dec 2002 || 192 || align=left | Disc.: NEAT || 
|- id="2002 PC40" bgcolor=#FA8072
| 3 ||  || MCA || 19.6 || data-sort-value="0.36" | 360 m || multiple || 2002–2015 || 25 Jan 2015 || 43 || align=left | Disc.: NEAT || 
|- id="2002 PG40" bgcolor=#FA8072
| 4 ||  || MCA || 18.4 || data-sort-value="0.62" | 620 m || single || 87 days || 04 Sep 2002 || 38 || align=left | Disc.: NEAT || 
|- id="2002 PH40" bgcolor=#E9E9E9
| 4 ||  || MBA-M || 17.5 || data-sort-value="0.94" | 940 m || single || 61 days || 03 Sep 2002 || 25 || align=left | Disc.: NEAT || 
|- id="2002 PJ40" bgcolor=#E9E9E9
| 0 ||  || MBA-M || 18.0 || data-sort-value="0.75" | 750 m || multiple || 2002–2019 || 31 Oct 2019 || 46 || align=left | Disc.: NEAT || 
|- id="2002 PE43" bgcolor=#FFC2E0
| 7 ||  || AMO || 24.1 || data-sort-value="0.054" | 54 m || single || 4 days || 14 Aug 2002 || 17 || align=left | Disc.: LINEAR || 
|- id="2002 PF43" bgcolor=#FFC2E0
| 0 ||  || AMO || 20.86 || data-sort-value="0.24" | 240 m || multiple || 2002–2021 || 11 Nov 2021 || 47 || align=left | Disc.: LINEARPotentially hazardous object || 
|- id="2002 PN43" bgcolor=#FA8072
| 2 ||  || MCA || 18.3 || 1.2 km || multiple || 2002–2016 || 18 Dec 2016 || 95 || align=left | Disc.: LINEAR || 
|- id="2002 PG51" bgcolor=#d6d6d6
| 0 ||  || MBA-O || 16.2 || 3.2 km || multiple || 2002–2020 || 10 Dec 2020 || 157 || align=left | Disc.: NEATAlt.: 2014 SF283 || 
|- id="2002 PM51" bgcolor=#d6d6d6
| 0 ||  || MBA-O || 15.93 || 3.6 km || multiple || 2000–2022 || 13 Jan 2022 || 171 || align=left | Disc.: NEATAlt.: 2012 HO66 || 
|- id="2002 PA52" bgcolor=#E9E9E9
| – ||  || MBA-M || 17.7 || data-sort-value="0.86" | 860 m || single || 56 days || 29 Aug 2002 || 16 || align=left | Disc.: NEAT || 
|- id="2002 PJ52" bgcolor=#fefefe
| 0 ||  || MBA-I || 18.4 || data-sort-value="0.62" | 620 m || multiple || 2002–2020 || 05 Nov 2020 || 55 || align=left | Disc.: NEAT || 
|- id="2002 PP52" bgcolor=#d6d6d6
| 0 ||  || MBA-O || 16.0 || 3.5 km || multiple || 2002–2021 || 23 Jan 2021 || 132 || align=left | Disc.: NEAT || 
|- id="2002 PH62" bgcolor=#fefefe
| 0 ||  || MBA-I || 18.3 || data-sort-value="0.65" | 650 m || multiple || 2002–2019 || 02 Nov 2019 || 88 || align=left | Disc.: NEATAlt.: 2015 HT114 || 
|- id="2002 PP63" bgcolor=#FA8072
| 0 ||  || MCA || 18.72 || data-sort-value="0.54" | 540 m || multiple || 1987–2021 || 27 Nov 2021 || 138 || align=left | Disc.: LONEOS || 
|- id="2002 PR64" bgcolor=#E9E9E9
| 0 ||  || MBA-M || 17.5 || data-sort-value="0.94" | 940 m || multiple || 2002–2019 || 31 Oct 2019 || 76 || align=left | Disc.: NEAT || 
|- id="2002 PS64" bgcolor=#E9E9E9
| 0 ||  || MBA-M || 17.0 || 1.2 km || multiple || 2002–2019 || 20 Dec 2019 || 135 || align=left | Disc.: NEATAlt.: 2014 KZ92 || 
|- id="2002 PE65" bgcolor=#E9E9E9
| 0 ||  || MBA-M || 17.3 || 1.5 km || multiple || 2002–2021 || 04 Jan 2021 || 83 || align=left | Disc.: NEAT || 
|- id="2002 PF65" bgcolor=#E9E9E9
| 2 ||  || MBA-M || 17.9 || data-sort-value="0.78" | 780 m || multiple || 2002–2016 || 03 Jan 2016 || 25 || align=left | Disc.: NEATAlt.: 2006 OH28 || 
|- id="2002 PU65" bgcolor=#E9E9E9
| 1 ||  || MBA-M || 18.4 || 1.2 km || multiple || 2002–2020 || 12 Sep 2020 || 88 || align=left | Disc.: CINEOS || 
|- id="2002 PJ66" bgcolor=#fefefe
| 1 ||  || MBA-I || 18.6 || data-sort-value="0.57" | 570 m || multiple || 1995–2020 || 15 Oct 2020 || 76 || align=left | Disc.: NEAT || 
|- id="2002 PZ66" bgcolor=#fefefe
| 1 ||  || MBA-I || 18.7 || data-sort-value="0.54" | 540 m || multiple || 2002–2019 || 10 Jun 2019 || 67 || align=left | Disc.: NEAT || 
|- id="2002 PA68" bgcolor=#E9E9E9
| 1 ||  || MBA-M || 17.5 || 1.3 km || multiple || 2002–2020 || 06 Dec 2020 || 65 || align=left | Disc.: NEAT || 
|- id="2002 PC68" bgcolor=#E9E9E9
| – ||  || MBA-M || 18.0 || data-sort-value="0.75" | 750 m || single || 44 days || 04 Sep 2002 || 20 || align=left | Disc.: NEAT || 
|- id="2002 PO68" bgcolor=#fefefe
| 3 ||  || MBA-I || 18.8 || data-sort-value="0.52" | 520 m || multiple || 2002–2019 || 21 Dec 2019 || 68 || align=left | Disc.: NEAT || 
|- id="2002 PX68" bgcolor=#E9E9E9
| 1 ||  || MBA-M || 17.2 || 1.5 km || multiple || 2002–2019 || 24 Nov 2019 || 242 || align=left | Disc.: LINEARAlt.: 2015 US67 || 
|- id="2002 PP70" bgcolor=#E9E9E9
| 0 ||  || MBA-M || 17.0 || 1.7 km || multiple || 2002–2020 || 24 Jan 2020 || 351 || align=left | Disc.: LINEAR || 
|- id="2002 PW70" bgcolor=#E9E9E9
| 0 ||  || MBA-M || 17.1 || 1.1 km || multiple || 2002–2020 || 02 Feb 2020 || 92 || align=left | Disc.: LINEARAlt.: 2006 PG29 || 
|- id="2002 PU71" bgcolor=#E9E9E9
| 0 ||  || MBA-M || 17.3 || 1.5 km || multiple || 2002–2021 || 17 Jan 2021 || 129 || align=left | Disc.: LINEAR || 
|- id="2002 PJ72" bgcolor=#E9E9E9
| 0 ||  || MBA-M || 17.94 || data-sort-value="0.77" | 770 m || multiple || 1998–2021 || 07 Apr 2021 || 39 || align=left | Disc.: LINEAR || 
|- id="2002 PN72" bgcolor=#E9E9E9
| 0 ||  || MBA-M || 17.4 || data-sort-value="0.98" | 980 m || multiple || 1994–2019 || 20 Dec 2019 || 109 || align=left | Disc.: LINEARAlt.: 2014 JP63 || 
|- id="2002 PO75" bgcolor=#FFC2E0
| 0 ||  || AMO || 19.37 || data-sort-value="0.47" | 470 m || multiple || 2002–2021 || 01 Dec 2021 || 132 || align=left | Disc.: LINEAR || 
|- id="2002 PQ75" bgcolor=#d6d6d6
| 0 ||  || MBA-O || 16.68 || 2.6 km || multiple || 2002–2022 || 06 Jan 2022 || 62 || align=left | Disc.: NEATAlt.: 2017 DO59 || 
|- id="2002 PD77" bgcolor=#d6d6d6
| 0 ||  || MBA-O || 16.4 || 2.9 km || multiple || 2002–2018 || 16 Sep 2018 || 52 || align=left | Disc.: NEAT || 
|- id="2002 PE78" bgcolor=#E9E9E9
| 0 ||  || MBA-M || 17.4 || 1.4 km || multiple || 2002–2020 || 23 Nov 2020 || 76 || align=left | Disc.: NEAT || 
|- id="2002 PH78" bgcolor=#E9E9E9
| 0 ||  || MBA-M || 17.3 || 1.5 km || multiple || 2002–2020 || 10 Dec 2020 || 103 || align=left | Disc.: NEATAlt.: 2015 OY34 || 
|- id="2002 PY79" bgcolor=#E9E9E9
| 0 ||  || MBA-M || 17.0 || 1.7 km || multiple || 1993–2019 || 15 Nov 2019 || 259 || align=left | Disc.: NEAT || 
|- id="2002 PG80" bgcolor=#FFC2E0
| 0 ||  || AMO || 18.64 || data-sort-value="0.71" | 700 m || multiple || 2002–2022 || 14 Oct 2022 || 570 || align=left | Disc.: LINEAR || 
|- id="2002 PJ80" bgcolor=#FA8072
| 0 ||  || MCA || 16.68 || 1.4 km || multiple || 2002–2021 || 17 Apr 2021 || 257 || align=left | Disc.: LINEARAlt.: 2002 NV7 || 
|- id="2002 PH81" bgcolor=#d6d6d6
| 0 ||  || MBA-O || 16.6 || 2.7 km || multiple || 2002–2018 || 15 Oct 2018 || 118 || align=left | Disc.: NEAT || 
|- id="2002 PZ86" bgcolor=#E9E9E9
| 0 ||  || MBA-M || 17.5 || data-sort-value="0.94" | 940 m || multiple || 2002–2019 || 27 Nov 2019 || 93 || align=left | Disc.: NEAT || 
|- id="2002 PD87" bgcolor=#fefefe
| 1 ||  || MBA-I || 18.3 || data-sort-value="0.65" | 650 m || multiple || 2002–2020 || 14 Sep 2020 || 48 || align=left | Disc.: NEAT || 
|- id="2002 PE87" bgcolor=#fefefe
| 0 ||  || HUN || 18.43 || data-sort-value="0.61" | 610 m || multiple || 2002–2022 || 22 Jan 2022 || 90 || align=left | Disc.: NEATAlt.: 2009 BO28, 2017 CZ30 || 
|- id="2002 PH87" bgcolor=#fefefe
| 0 ||  || MBA-I || 17.17 || 1.1 km || multiple || 2002–2022 || 23 Jan 2022 || 100 || align=left | Disc.: NEATAlt.: 2013 QF4 || 
|- id="2002 PM87" bgcolor=#FA8072
| 1 ||  || MCA || 18.0 || data-sort-value="0.75" | 750 m || multiple || 2002–2020 || 22 Oct 2020 || 59 || align=left | Disc.: NEATAlt.: 2016 NN25 || 
|- id="2002 PF89" bgcolor=#E9E9E9
| 0 ||  || MBA-M || 16.6 || 2.0 km || multiple || 2002–2021 || 11 Jan 2021 || 298 || align=left | Disc.: LINEAR || 
|- id="2002 PL91" bgcolor=#E9E9E9
| 0 ||  || MBA-M || 16.83 || 1.8 km || multiple || 1998–2021 || 07 Apr 2021 || 297 || align=left | Disc.: NEAT || 
|- id="2002 PC95" bgcolor=#E9E9E9
| 0 ||  || MBA-M || 17.7 || data-sort-value="0.86" | 860 m || multiple || 2002–2019 || 29 Nov 2019 || 147 || align=left | Disc.: NEAT || 
|- id="2002 PG95" bgcolor=#d6d6d6
| 0 ||  || MBA-O || 15.8 || 3.9 km || multiple || 2002–2021 || 16 Jan 2021 || 222 || align=left | Disc.: NEATAlt.: 2011 DU45 || 
|- id="2002 PT98" bgcolor=#d6d6d6
| 0 ||  || MBA-O || 15.7 || 4.0 km || multiple || 2002–2020 || 06 Jan 2020 || 384 || align=left | Disc.: LINEARAlt.: 2013 SR26 || 
|- id="2002 PP99" bgcolor=#E9E9E9
| 1 ||  || MBA-M || 17.4 || 1.4 km || multiple || 2002–2019 || 24 Dec 2019 || 118 || align=left | Disc.: LINEARAlt.: 2015 VF104 || 
|- id="2002 PO100" bgcolor=#fefefe
| 1 ||  || MBA-I || 17.4 || data-sort-value="0.98" | 980 m || multiple || 2002–2020 || 17 May 2020 || 180 || align=left | Disc.: LINEAR || 
|- id="2002 PW100" bgcolor=#fefefe
| 0 ||  || MBA-I || 17.4 || data-sort-value="0.98" | 980 m || multiple || 2001–2021 || 15 Jan 2021 || 278 || align=left | Disc.: NEAT || 
|- id="2002 PR102" bgcolor=#d6d6d6
| 0 ||  || MBA-O || 16.15 || 3.3 km || multiple || 2000–2022 || 25 Jan 2022 || 150 || align=left | Disc.: LINEAR || 
|- id="2002 PX103" bgcolor=#fefefe
| 0 ||  || MBA-I || 17.9 || data-sort-value="0.78" | 780 m || multiple || 2002–2020 || 21 Dec 2020 || 118 || align=left | Disc.: LINEAR || 
|- id="2002 PM106" bgcolor=#d6d6d6
| 0 ||  || MBA-O || 16.13 || 3.3 km || multiple || 2002–2022 || 27 Jan 2022 || 102 || align=left | Disc.: LINEARAlt.: 2013 MS5 || 
|- id="2002 PW106" bgcolor=#E9E9E9
| 0 ||  || MBA-M || 17.2 || 1.1 km || multiple || 2002–2019 || 08 Nov 2019 || 105 || align=left | Disc.: LINEAR || 
|- id="2002 PX106" bgcolor=#d6d6d6
| 0 ||  || MBA-O || 17.3 || 1.9 km || multiple || 2002–2019 || 28 Oct 2019 || 78 || align=left | Disc.: LINEAR || 
|- id="2002 PS107" bgcolor=#d6d6d6
| 0 ||  || MBA-O || 16.71 || 2.5 km || multiple || 2002–2021 || 08 May 2021 || 117 || align=left | Disc.: NEATAlt.: 2015 BU289 || 
|- id="2002 PX110" bgcolor=#fefefe
| 0 ||  || MBA-I || 18.2 || data-sort-value="0.68" | 680 m || multiple || 2002–2021 || 03 Jan 2021 || 93 || align=left | Disc.: LINEAR || 
|- id="2002 PL111" bgcolor=#E9E9E9
| 2 ||  || MBA-M || 17.7 || data-sort-value="0.86" | 860 m || multiple || 2002–2019 || 20 Dec 2019 || 93 || align=left | Disc.: NEATAlt.: 2019 TD33 || 
|- id="2002 PC112" bgcolor=#E9E9E9
| 2 ||  || MBA-M || 18.2 || data-sort-value="0.96" | 960 m || multiple || 2002–2015 || 10 Nov 2015 || 53 || align=left | Disc.: NEAT || 
|- id="2002 PD112" bgcolor=#E9E9E9
| 1 ||  || MBA-M || 17.7 || 1.2 km || multiple || 2002–2019 || 28 Jul 2019 || 59 || align=left | Disc.: NEAT || 
|- id="2002 PE112" bgcolor=#E9E9E9
| 0 ||  || MBA-M || 17.3 || 1.5 km || multiple || 2002–2019 || 21 Jul 2019 || 171 || align=left | Disc.: NEATAlt.: 2015 PX229 || 
|- id="2002 PK112" bgcolor=#E9E9E9
| 1 ||  || MBA-M || 18.2 || data-sort-value="0.68" | 680 m || multiple || 2002–2019 || 26 Nov 2019 || 53 || align=left | Disc.: NEAT || 
|- id="2002 PN112" bgcolor=#fefefe
| 3 ||  || MBA-I || 18.4 || data-sort-value="0.62" | 620 m || multiple || 2002–2019 || 29 Nov 2019 || 55 || align=left | Disc.: NEAT || 
|- id="2002 PQ112" bgcolor=#E9E9E9
| 0 ||  || MBA-M || 17.57 || 1.7 km || multiple || 2002–2021 || 27 Oct 2021 || 117 || align=left | Disc.: NEAT || 
|- id="2002 PZ112" bgcolor=#E9E9E9
| – ||  || MBA-M || 17.0 || 1.2 km || single || 52 days || 04 Sep 2002 || 21 || align=left | Disc.: LINEAR || 
|- id="2002 PM113" bgcolor=#FA8072
| 1 ||  || MCA || 17.4 || 1.8 km || multiple || 2002–2021 || 12 Jan 2021 || 129 || align=left | Disc.: NEAT || 
|- id="2002 PP113" bgcolor=#FA8072
| 0 ||  || MCA || 18.85 || data-sort-value="0.50" | 500 m || multiple || 2002–2021 || 02 Oct 2021 || 141 || align=left | Disc.: NEAT || 
|- id="2002 PA114" bgcolor=#E9E9E9
| 0 ||  || MBA-M || 17.0 || 1.2 km || multiple || 2002–2021 || 18 Jan 2021 || 171 || align=left | Disc.: AMOS || 
|- id="2002 PL114" bgcolor=#fefefe
| 0 ||  || MBA-I || 18.6 || data-sort-value="0.57" | 570 m || multiple || 2002–2016 || 04 Oct 2016 || 43 || align=left | Disc.: LPL/Spacewatch IIAdded on 22 July 2020Alt.: 2015 FJ280 || 
|- id="2002 PU114" bgcolor=#fefefe
| 0 ||  || MBA-I || 18.6 || data-sort-value="0.57" | 570 m || multiple || 2002–2020 || 05 Nov 2020 || 67 || align=left | Disc.: LPL/Spacewatch II || 
|- id="2002 PC115" bgcolor=#fefefe
| 0 ||  || MBA-I || 19.34 || data-sort-value="0.40" | 400 m || multiple || 2002–2021 || 24 Oct 2021 || 70 || align=left | Disc.: LPL/Spacewatch IIAlt.: 2015 XY277 || 
|- id="2002 PE120" bgcolor=#fefefe
| 0 ||  || MBA-I || 17.8 || data-sort-value="0.82" | 820 m || multiple || 2002–2020 || 17 Dec 2020 || 227 || align=left | Disc.: LONEOS || 
|- id="2002 PZ120" bgcolor=#FA8072
| 0 ||  || MCA || 18.4 || data-sort-value="0.62" | 620 m || multiple || 2002–2020 || 14 Nov 2020 || 195 || align=left | Disc.: LONEOSAlt.: 2009 LY3 || 
|- id="2002 PC121" bgcolor=#E9E9E9
| 0 ||  || MBA-M || 17.6 || 1.3 km || multiple || 2002–2021 || 18 Jan 2021 || 125 || align=left | Disc.: LONEOS || 
|- id="2002 PU121" bgcolor=#FA8072
| 0 ||  || MCA || 17.6 || 1.3 km || multiple || 2002–2021 || 16 Jan 2021 || 59 || align=left | Disc.: LONEOSAlt.: 2015 TS164 || 
|- id="2002 PX121" bgcolor=#E9E9E9
| 1 ||  || MBA-M || 17.9 || 1.1 km || multiple || 2002–2019 || 25 Nov 2019 || 110 || align=left | Disc.: LONEOSAlt.: 2015 TQ105 || 
|- id="2002 PM122" bgcolor=#E9E9E9
| 1 ||  || MBA-M || 17.4 || data-sort-value="0.98" | 980 m || multiple || 1994–2021 || 07 Mar 2021 || 52 || align=left | Disc.: LPL/Spacewatch II || 
|- id="2002 PE130" bgcolor=#FFC2E0
| 0 ||  || APO || 18.2 || data-sort-value="0.81" | 810 m || multiple || 2002–2011 || 31 Jan 2011 || 136 || align=left | Disc.: LINEARPotentially hazardous objectNEO larger than 1 kilometer || 
|- id="2002 PP130" bgcolor=#d6d6d6
| 0 ||  || MBA-O || 16.43 || 2.9 km || multiple || 2002–2021 || 14 Apr 2021 || 115 || align=left | Disc.: NEAT || 
|- id="2002 PT130" bgcolor=#FA8072
| 1 ||  || MCA || 18.5 || data-sort-value="0.59" | 590 m || multiple || 1992–2019 || 14 Nov 2019 || 149 || align=left | Disc.: LINEAR || 
|- id="2002 PU130" bgcolor=#FA8072
| 0 ||  || MCA || 16.43 || 2.1 km || multiple || 2002–2021 || 16 Apr 2021 || 272 || align=left | Disc.: LINEARAlt.: 2012 BU71 || 
|- id="2002 PB131" bgcolor=#E9E9E9
| 0 ||  || MBA-M || 17.4 || data-sort-value="0.98" | 980 m || multiple || 2002–2019 || 20 Dec 2019 || 57 || align=left | Disc.: NEAT || 
|- id="2002 PC131" bgcolor=#FA8072
| 1 ||  || MCA || 19.31 || data-sort-value="0.41" | 410 m || multiple || 2002–2021 || 30 Nov 2021 || 52 || align=left | Disc.: NEAT || 
|- id="2002 PN131" bgcolor=#E9E9E9
| 0 ||  || MBA-M || 16.48 || 2.1 km || multiple || 2002–2021 || 07 Apr 2021 || 306 || align=left | Disc.: NEATAlt.: 2011 WF2 || 
|- id="2002 PY131" bgcolor=#E9E9E9
| 0 ||  || MBA-M || 17.2 || 1.5 km || multiple || 2002–2021 || 11 Jan 2021 || 218 || align=left | Disc.: LPL/Spacewatch IIAlt.: 2011 SZ26 || 
|- id="2002 PT136" bgcolor=#FA8072
| 0 ||  || MCA || 18.4 || data-sort-value="0.62" | 620 m || multiple || 2002–2018 || 11 Jul 2018 || 139 || align=left | Disc.: NEAT || 
|- id="2002 PE138" bgcolor=#d6d6d6
| 0 ||  || MBA-O || 17.0 || 2.2 km || multiple || 2002–2020 || 25 Jan 2020 || 173 || align=left | Disc.: NEATAlt.: 2015 AX70 || 
|- id="2002 PG138" bgcolor=#d6d6d6
| 0 ||  || MBA-O || 16.2 || 3.2 km || multiple || 2002–2020 || 27 Feb 2020 || 124 || align=left | Disc.: NEAT || 
|- id="2002 PV138" bgcolor=#fefefe
| – ||  || MBA-I || 18.7 || data-sort-value="0.54" | 540 m || single || 27 days || 19 Aug 2002 || 10 || align=left | Disc.: NEAT || 
|- id="2002 PR139" bgcolor=#d6d6d6
| 1 ||  || MBA-O || 16.5 || 2.8 km || multiple || 2002–2021 || 12 Jan 2021 || 75 || align=left | Disc.: LINEARAlt.: 2013 QA5 || 
|- id="2002 PO140" bgcolor=#fefefe
| 2 ||  || MBA-I || 18.2 || data-sort-value="0.68" | 680 m || multiple || 2002–2019 || 08 Jan 2019 || 29 || align=left | Disc.: LONEOSAlt.: 2006 UO184 || 
|- id="2002 PR140" bgcolor=#FA8072
| 6 ||  || MCA || 18.7 || data-sort-value="0.54" | 540 m || single || 34 days || 02 Sep 2002 || 39 || align=left | Disc.: CINEOS || 
|- id="2002 PS140" bgcolor=#FA8072
| – ||  || MCA || 19.6 || data-sort-value="0.67" | 670 m || single || 37 days || 21 Sep 2002 || 30 || align=left | Disc.: NEAT || 
|- id="2002 PT140" bgcolor=#FA8072
| 0 ||  || MCA || 20.81 || data-sort-value="0.29" | 290 m || multiple || 2002–2019 || 29 Oct 2019 || 143 || align=left | Disc.: NEAT || 
|- id="2002 PB141" bgcolor=#d6d6d6
| 1 ||  || MBA-O || 16.1 || 3.4 km || multiple || 2002–2020 || 19 Dec 2020 || 114 || align=left | Disc.: Siding SpringAlt.: 2017 FT148 || 
|- id="2002 PD141" bgcolor=#d6d6d6
| 0 ||  || MBA-O || 16.8 || 2.4 km || multiple || 1997–2018 || 14 Dec 2018 || 178 || align=left | Disc.: Siding Spring || 
|- id="2002 PK141" bgcolor=#d6d6d6
| 2 ||  || MBA-O || 16.7 || 2.5 km || multiple || 2002–2018 || 17 Aug 2018 || 52 || align=left | Disc.: NEAT || 
|- id="2002 PL141" bgcolor=#E9E9E9
| 0 ||  || MBA-M || 16.93 || 2.3 km || multiple || 2002–2022 || 24 Jan 2022 || 207 || align=left | Disc.: NEAT || 
|- id="2002 PT141" bgcolor=#d6d6d6
| 0 ||  || MBA-O || 17.08 || 2.1 km || multiple || 2002–2021 || 27 Sep 2021 || 76 || align=left | Disc.: NEAT || 
|- id="2002 PU141" bgcolor=#E9E9E9
| 2 ||  || MBA-M || 17.6 || 1.3 km || multiple || 2002–2020 || 18 Nov 2020 || 63 || align=left | Disc.: LONEOSAlt.: 2015 NK25 || 
|- id="2002 PY141" bgcolor=#E9E9E9
| 2 ||  || MBA-M || 17.1 || 1.6 km || multiple || 2002–2021 || 06 Jan 2021 || 113 || align=left | Disc.: LONEOSAlt.: 2011 SN111 || 
|- id="2002 PA142" bgcolor=#fefefe
| 0 ||  || HUN || 17.8 || data-sort-value="0.82" | 820 m || multiple || 2002–2019 || 05 Jan 2019 || 138 || align=left | Disc.: NEATAlt.: 2009 DO109 || 
|- id="2002 PR142" bgcolor=#E9E9E9
| 2 ||  || MBA-M || 18.5 || data-sort-value="0.84" | 840 m || multiple || 2002–2020 || 05 Nov 2020 || 26 || align=left | Disc.: Cerro TololoAdded on 9 March 2021 || 
|- id="2002 PA143" bgcolor=#fefefe
| 0 ||  || MBA-I || 18.7 || data-sort-value="0.54" | 540 m || multiple || 2002–2020 || 22 Oct 2020 || 52 || align=left | Disc.: Cerro TololoAdded on 11 May 2021Alt.: 2019 GF80 || 
|- id="2002 PM143" bgcolor=#fefefe
| 1 ||  || MBA-I || 19.2 || data-sort-value="0.43" | 430 m || multiple || 2002–2020 || 23 Sep 2020 || 44 || align=left | Disc.: Cerro Tololo || 
|- id="2002 PQ143" bgcolor=#E9E9E9
| 0 ||  || MBA-M || 17.9 || 1.5 km || multiple || 2002–2020 || 10 Aug 2020 || 32 || align=left | Disc.: Cerro TololoAdded on 24 December 2021 || 
|- id="2002 PV143" bgcolor=#d6d6d6
| 0 ||  || MBA-O || 17.5 || 1.8 km || multiple || 2002–2021 || 15 Jan 2021 || 34 || align=left | Disc.: Cerro Tololo || 
|- id="2002 PH144" bgcolor=#E9E9E9
| 0 ||  || MBA-M || 18.1 || data-sort-value="0.71" | 710 m || multiple || 2002–2021 || 13 Feb 2021 || 55 || align=left | Disc.: Cerro TololoAdded on 21 August 2021Alt.: 2006 ON25, 2017 CH13 || 
|- id="2002 PL144" bgcolor=#d6d6d6
| 0 ||  || MBA-O || 17.40 || 1.8 km || multiple || 2002–2020 || 20 Oct 2020 || 28 || align=left | Disc.: Cerro TololoAdded on 9 March 2021 || 
|- id="2002 PO144" bgcolor=#fefefe
| 1 ||  || MBA-I || 19.17 || data-sort-value="0.44" | 440 m || multiple || 2002–2021 || 27 Sep 2021 || 26 || align=left | Disc.: Cerro TololoAdded on 30 September 2021Alt.: 2021 PR67 || 
|- id="2002 PB145" bgcolor=#fefefe
| 1 ||  || MBA-I || 19.32 || data-sort-value="0.41" | 410 m || multiple || 2002–2021 || 26 Nov 2021 || 27 || align=left | Disc.: Cerro TololoAdded on 24 December 2021 || 
|- id="2002 PJ146" bgcolor=#d6d6d6
| 0 ||  || MBA-O || 17.5 || 1.8 km || multiple || 2002–2020 || 16 Mar 2020 || 35 || align=left | Disc.: Cerro TololoAdded on 22 July 2020 || 
|- id="2002 PK146" bgcolor=#d6d6d6
| 0 ||  || MBA-O || 17.10 || 2.1 km || multiple || 2002–2020 || 19 Apr 2020 || 112 || align=left | Disc.: Cerro Tololo || 
|- id="2002 PM146" bgcolor=#fefefe
| 2 ||  || MBA-I || 18.95 || data-sort-value="0.48" | 480 m || multiple || 2002–2021 || 08 Aug 2021 || 30 || align=left | Disc.: Cerro TololoAdded on 22 July 2020 || 
|- id="2002 PL147" bgcolor=#E9E9E9
| 0 ||  || MBA-M || 18.05 || 1.4 km || multiple || 2002–2021 || 30 Nov 2021 || 39 || align=left | Disc.: Cerro TololoAdded on 24 December 2021 || 
|- id="2002 PN147" bgcolor=#C2E0FF
| E ||  || TNO || 6.3 || 189 km || single || 1 day || 10 Aug 2002 || 3 || align=left | Disc.: Cerro TololoLoUTNOs, cubewano? || 
|- id="2002 PP147" bgcolor=#d6d6d6
| 0 ||  || MBA-O || 16.5 || 2.8 km || multiple || 2002–2019 || 31 Oct 2019 || 38 || align=left | Disc.: Cerro Tololo || 
|- id="2002 PY147" bgcolor=#fefefe
| 0 ||  || MBA-I || 18.6 || data-sort-value="0.57" | 570 m || multiple || 2002–2020 || 19 Oct 2020 || 82 || align=left | Disc.: Cerro TololoAdded on 21 August 2021Alt.: 2013 RT134 || 
|- id="2002 PZ147" bgcolor=#E9E9E9
| 0 ||  || MBA-M || 18.7 || data-sort-value="0.76" | 760 m || multiple || 2002–2019 || 22 Oct 2019 || 31 || align=left | Disc.: Cerro TololoAdded on 22 July 2020 || 
|- id="2002 PU148" bgcolor=#E9E9E9
| E ||  || MBA-M || 17.6 || 1.7 km || single || 2 days || 12 Aug 2002 || 4 || align=left | Disc.: Cerro Tololo || 
|- id="2002 PV148" bgcolor=#E9E9E9
| 1 ||  || MBA-M || 18.3 || data-sort-value="0.65" | 650 m || multiple || 2002–2018 || 13 Aug 2018 || 48 || align=left | Disc.: Cerro TololoAdded on 22 July 2020 || 
|- id="2002 PX148" bgcolor=#E9E9E9
| – ||  || MBA-M || 18.1 || 1.0 km || single || 5 days || 15 Aug 2002 || 7 || align=left | Disc.: Cerro Tololo || 
|- id="2002 PB149" bgcolor=#fefefe
| 1 ||  || MBA-I || 19.3 || data-sort-value="0.41" | 410 m || multiple || 2002–2020 || 14 Sep 2020 || 37 || align=left | Disc.: Cerro Tololo || 
|- id="2002 PC149" bgcolor=#fefefe
| 0 ||  || MBA-I || 18.84 || data-sort-value="0.51" | 510 m || multiple || 1999–2021 || 10 Apr 2021 || 62 || align=left | Disc.: Cerro TololoAlt.: 2012 UZ5 || 
|- id="2002 PE149" bgcolor=#C2E0FF
| E ||  || TNO || 6.6 || 164 km || single || 1 day || 12 Aug 2002 || 3 || align=left | Disc.: Cerro TololoLoUTNOs, cubewano? || 
|- id="2002 PF149" bgcolor=#C2E0FF
| E ||  || TNO || 6.6 || 164 km || single || 1 day || 12 Aug 2002 || 3 || align=left | Disc.: Cerro TololoLoUTNOs, cubewano? || 
|- id="2002 PH149" bgcolor=#C2E0FF
| E ||  || TNO || 6.6 || 164 km || single || 1 day || 12 Aug 2002 || 3 || align=left | Disc.: Cerro TololoLoUTNOs, cubewano? || 
|- id="2002 PJ149" bgcolor=#C2E0FF
| E ||  || TNO || 5.3 || 299 km || single || 1 day || 12 Aug 2002 || 3 || align=left | Disc.: Cerro TololoLoUTNOs, cubewano? || 
|- id="2002 PK149" bgcolor=#C2E0FF
| E ||  || TNO || 7.0 || 166 km || single || 1 day || 12 Aug 2002 || 3 || align=left | Disc.: Cerro TololoLoUTNOs, other TNO || 
|- id="2002 PN149" bgcolor=#C2E0FF
| E ||  || TNO || 7.0 || 137 km || single || 29 days || 09 Sep 2002 || 5 || align=left | Disc.: Cerro TololoLoUTNOs, cubewano? || 
|- id="2002 PO149" bgcolor=#C2E0FF
| 4 ||  || TNO || 6.64 || 156 km || multiple || 2002–2021 || 08 Aug 2021 || 16 || align=left | Disc.: Cerro TololoLoUTNOs, cubewano (cold) || 
|- id="2002 PP149" bgcolor=#C2E0FF
| 4 ||  || TNO || 6.9 || 173 km || multiple || 2000–2017 || 23 Sep 2017 || 19 || align=left | Disc.: Cerro TololoLoUTNOs, other TNO, BR-mag: 1.13Alt.: 2000 QM252 || 
|- id="2002 PQ149" bgcolor=#C2E0FF
| E ||  || TNO || 7.1 || 158 km || single || 87 days || 06 Nov 2002 || 6 || align=left | Disc.: Cerro TololoLoUTNOs, other TNO || 
|- id="2002 PR149" bgcolor=#C2E0FF
| 2 ||  || TNO || 7.0 || 132 km || multiple || 2002–2018 || 10 Oct 2018 || 20 || align=left | Disc.: Cerro TololoAdded on 30 September 2021LoUTNOs, cubewano (cold)Alt.: 2013 TR228 || 
|- id="2002 PZ149" bgcolor=#fefefe
| 0 ||  || MBA-I || 17.9 || data-sort-value="0.78" | 780 m || multiple || 2000–2020 || 15 Oct 2020 || 93 || align=left | Disc.: Cerro TololoAlt.: 2002 TS360 || 
|- id="2002 PC150" bgcolor=#E9E9E9
| 0 ||  || MBA-M || 17.9 || 1.5 km || multiple || 2002–2020 || 15 Oct 2020 || 38 || align=left | Disc.: Cerro TololoAdded on 11 May 2021 || 
|- id="2002 PG150" bgcolor=#C2E0FF
| 4 ||  || TNO || 7.98 || 92 km || multiple || 2002–2018 || 10 Oct 2018 || 20 || align=left | Disc.: Cerro TololoLoUTNOs, res4:7 || 
|- id="2002 PH150" bgcolor=#fefefe
| 0 ||  || MBA-I || 17.85 || data-sort-value="0.80" | 800 m || multiple || 2002–2022 || 06 Jan 2022 || 128 || align=left | Disc.: NEAT || 
|- id="2002 PK150" bgcolor=#E9E9E9
| 0 ||  || MBA-M || 17.4 || 1.4 km || multiple || 2002–2021 || 18 Jan 2021 || 141 || align=left | Disc.: NEAT || 
|- id="2002 PX150" bgcolor=#d6d6d6
| 0 ||  || MBA-O || 16.4 || 2.9 km || multiple || 2002–2021 || 11 Jan 2021 || 135 || align=left | Disc.: NEAT || 
|- id="2002 PB151" bgcolor=#E9E9E9
| 0 ||  || MBA-M || 17.7 || data-sort-value="0.86" | 860 m || multiple || 1998–2019 || 02 Nov 2019 || 83 || align=left | Disc.: NEATAlt.: 2011 WB155 || 
|- id="2002 PY151" bgcolor=#E9E9E9
| – ||  || MBA-M || 17.6 || data-sort-value="0.90" | 900 m || single || 47 days || 30 Aug 2002 || 23 || align=left | Disc.: Cerro Tololo || 
|- id="2002 PE152" bgcolor=#d6d6d6
| 0 ||  || MBA-O || 16.73 || 2.5 km || multiple || 2002–2022 || 15 Jan 2022 || 104 || align=left | Disc.: Cerro Tololo || 
|- id="2002 PJ152" bgcolor=#fefefe
| 0 ||  || MBA-I || 18.0 || data-sort-value="0.75" | 750 m || multiple || 2002–2019 || 29 Nov 2019 || 111 || align=left | Disc.: Cerro Tololo || 
|- id="2002 PP152" bgcolor=#E9E9E9
| 1 ||  || MBA-M || 17.4 || 1.4 km || multiple || 2002–2019 || 29 Nov 2019 || 93 || align=left | Disc.: NEATAlt.: 2010 DT99 || 
|- id="2002 PQ152" bgcolor=#C7FF8F
| 1 ||  || CEN || 9.2 || 80 km || multiple || 2001–2017 || 28 Oct 2017 || 33 || align=left | Disc.: Cerro Tololo, BR-mag: 1.85 || 
|- id="2002 PR152" bgcolor=#C2E0FF
| E ||  || TNO || 8.7 || 62 km || single || 2 days || 15 Aug 2002 || 5 || align=left | Disc.: Cerro TololoLoUTNOs, cubewano? || 
|- id="2002 PS152" bgcolor=#C2E0FF
| E ||  || TNO || 8.9 || 57 km || single || 2 days || 15 Aug 2002 || 4 || align=left | Disc.: Cerro TololoLoUTNOs, cubewano? || 
|- id="2002 PT152" bgcolor=#C2E0FF
| E ||  || TNO || 8.3 || 75 km || single || 2 days || 15 Aug 2002 || 6 || align=left | Disc.: Cerro TololoLoUTNOs, cubewano? || 
|- id="2002 PU152" bgcolor=#C2E0FF
| E ||  || TNO || 8.6 || 65 km || single || 2 days || 15 Aug 2002 || 6 || align=left | Disc.: Cerro TololoLoUTNOs, cubewano? || 
|- id="2002 PV152" bgcolor=#C2E0FF
| E ||  || TNO || 9.5 || 43 km || single || 2 days || 15 Aug 2002 || 6 || align=left | Disc.: Cerro TololoLoUTNOs, cubewano? || 
|- id="2002 PW152" bgcolor=#C2E0FF
| E ||  || TNO || 9.0 || 54 km || single || 2 days || 15 Aug 2002 || 6 || align=left | Disc.: Cerro TololoLoUTNOs, cubewano? || 
|- id="2002 PX152" bgcolor=#C2E0FF
| E ||  || TNO || 8.7 || 62 km || single || 2 days || 15 Aug 2002 || 6 || align=left | Disc.: Cerro TololoLoUTNOs, cubewano? || 
|- id="2002 PY152" bgcolor=#C2E0FF
| E ||  || TNO || 9.4 || 45 km || single || 2 days || 15 Aug 2002 || 4 || align=left | Disc.: Cerro TololoLoUTNOs, cubewano? || 
|- id="2002 PZ152" bgcolor=#C2E0FF
| E ||  || TNO || 9.1 || 63 km || single || 2 days || 15 Aug 2002 || 5 || align=left | Disc.: Cerro TololoLoUTNOs, other TNO || 
|- id="2002 PA153" bgcolor=#C2E0FF
| E ||  || TNO || 8.8 || 60 km || single || 2 days || 15 Aug 2002 || 5 || align=left | Disc.: Cerro TololoLoUTNOs, cubewano? || 
|- id="2002 PB153" bgcolor=#C2E0FF
| E ||  || TNO || 9.1 || 52 km || single || 2 days || 15 Aug 2002 || 5 || align=left | Disc.: Cerro TololoLoUTNOs, cubewano? || 
|- id="2002 PC153" bgcolor=#C2E0FF
| E ||  || TNO || 7.9 || 90 km || single || 2 days || 15 Aug 2002 || 5 || align=left | Disc.: Cerro TololoLoUTNOs, cubewano? || 
|- id="2002 PD153" bgcolor=#C2E0FF
| E ||  || TNO || 8.7 || 62 km || single || 2 days || 15 Aug 2002 || 5 || align=left | Disc.: Cerro TololoLoUTNOs, cubewano? || 
|- id="2002 PE153" bgcolor=#C2E0FF
| E ||  || TNO || 6.5 || 172 km || single || 2 days || 15 Aug 2002 || 5 || align=left | Disc.: Cerro TololoLoUTNOs, cubewano? || 
|- id="2002 PF153" bgcolor=#C2E0FF
| E ||  || TNO || 9.0 || 54 km || single || 2 days || 15 Aug 2002 || 5 || align=left | Disc.: Cerro TololoLoUTNOs, cubewano? || 
|- id="2002 PG153" bgcolor=#C2E0FF
| E ||  || TNO || 9.1 || 50 km || single || 2 days || 15 Aug 2002 || 5 || align=left | Disc.: Cerro TololoLoUTNOs, cubewano (cold) || 
|- id="2002 PJ153" bgcolor=#C2E0FF
| E ||  || TNO || 8.9 || 57 km || single || 2 days || 15 Aug 2002 || 5 || align=left | Disc.: Cerro TololoLoUTNOs, cubewano? || 
|- id="2002 PK153" bgcolor=#C2E0FF
| E ||  || TNO || 7.7 || 99 km || single || 2 days || 16 Aug 2002 || 5 || align=left | Disc.: Cerro TololoLoUTNOs, cubewano? || 
|- id="2002 PL153" bgcolor=#C2E0FF
| E ||  || TNO || 8.7 || 62 km || single || 2 days || 16 Aug 2002 || 5 || align=left | Disc.: Cerro TololoLoUTNOs, cubewano? || 
|- id="2002 PM153" bgcolor=#C2E0FF
| E ||  || TNO || 9.0 || 66 km || single || 2 days || 15 Aug 2002 || 6 || align=left | Disc.: Cerro TololoLoUTNOs, other TNO || 
|- id="2002 PN153" bgcolor=#C2E0FF
| E ||  || TNO || 7.7 || 99 km || single || 2 days || 16 Aug 2002 || 5 || align=left | Disc.: Cerro TololoLoUTNOs, cubewano? || 
|- id="2002 PO153" bgcolor=#C2E0FF
| E ||  || TNO || 8.4 || 72 km || single || 2 days || 16 Aug 2002 || 6 || align=left | Disc.: Cerro TololoLoUTNOs, cubewano? || 
|- id="2002 PP153" bgcolor=#C2E0FF
| E ||  || TNO || 7.3 || 119 km || single || 2 days || 16 Aug 2002 || 6 || align=left | Disc.: Cerro TololoLoUTNOs, cubewano? || 
|- id="2002 PB154" bgcolor=#fefefe
| 0 ||  || MBA-I || 18.0 || data-sort-value="0.75" | 750 m || multiple || 2002–2020 || 16 Nov 2020 || 109 || align=left | Disc.: NEATAlt.: 2015 BM492 || 
|- id="2002 PG154" bgcolor=#E9E9E9
| 1 ||  || MBA-M || 19.0 || data-sort-value="0.47" | 470 m || multiple || 1994–2019 || 20 Oct 2019 || 41 || align=left | Disc.: Cerro TololoAdded on 22 July 2020 || 
|- id="2002 PH154" bgcolor=#fefefe
| 0 ||  || MBA-I || 18.65 || data-sort-value="0.55" | 550 m || multiple || 2002–2021 || 06 Apr 2021 || 66 || align=left | Disc.: Cerro TololoAlt.: 2012 QU22 || 
|- id="2002 PJ154" bgcolor=#fefefe
| 0 ||  || MBA-I || 18.93 || data-sort-value="0.49" | 490 m || multiple || 2002–2021 || 13 Jul 2021 || 38 || align=left | Disc.: Cerro Tololo || 
|- id="2002 PZ154" bgcolor=#d6d6d6
| 0 ||  || MBA-O || 16.6 || 2.7 km || multiple || 2002–2021 || 18 Jan 2021 || 96 || align=left | Disc.: CINEOS || 
|- id="2002 PD155" bgcolor=#C2E0FF
| 3 ||  || TNO || 7.1 || 195 km || multiple || 2001–2020 || 20 Oct 2020 || 18 || align=left | Disc.: Cerro TololoLoUTNOs, cubewano (hot) || 
|- id="2002 PE155" bgcolor=#C2E0FF
| E ||  || TNO || 6.2 || 197 km || single || 3 days || 12 Aug 2002 || 4 || align=left | Disc.: Cerro TololoLoUTNOs, cubewano? || 
|- id="2002 PG155" bgcolor=#E9E9E9
| 0 ||  || MBA-M || 16.9 || 1.2 km || multiple || 2002–2021 || 17 Jan 2021 || 125 || align=left | Disc.: NEAT || 
|- id="2002 PY155" bgcolor=#fefefe
| 0 ||  || MBA-I || 18.81 || data-sort-value="0.51" | 510 m || multiple || 1996–2022 || 06 Jan 2022 || 90 || align=left | Disc.: NEAT || 
|- id="2002 PV156" bgcolor=#d6d6d6
| 0 ||  || MBA-O || 16.4 || 2.9 km || multiple || 2002–2020 || 26 Apr 2020 || 132 || align=left | Disc.: NEAT || 
|- id="2002 PL157" bgcolor=#E9E9E9
| 0 ||  || MBA-M || 16.8 || 1.3 km || multiple || 2002–2021 || 18 Jan 2021 || 151 || align=left | Disc.: NEAT || 
|- id="2002 PN158" bgcolor=#d6d6d6
| 0 ||  || MBA-O || 16.1 || 3.4 km || multiple || 2002–2021 || 18 Jan 2021 || 154 || align=left | Disc.: NEAT || 
|- id="2002 PX158" bgcolor=#E9E9E9
| 0 ||  || MBA-M || 17.8 || 1.2 km || multiple || 2002–2021 || 23 Jan 2021 || 46 || align=left | Disc.: NEAT || 
|- id="2002 PN159" bgcolor=#E9E9E9
| 0 ||  || MBA-M || 17.6 || 1.7 km || multiple || 2002–2021 || 09 Jan 2021 || 206 || align=left | Disc.: NEAT || 
|- id="2002 PF160" bgcolor=#FA8072
| 1 ||  || MCA || 19.2 || data-sort-value="0.43" | 430 m || multiple || 2002–2018 || 15 Sep 2018 || 60 || align=left | Disc.: NEAT || 
|- id="2002 PV160" bgcolor=#fefefe
| 0 ||  || MBA-I || 18.00 || data-sort-value="0.75" | 750 m || multiple || 2002–2021 || 28 Nov 2021 || 80 || align=left | Disc.: NEAT || 
|- id="2002 PY160" bgcolor=#E9E9E9
| 2 ||  || MBA-M || 17.9 || data-sort-value="0.78" | 780 m || multiple || 2002–2020 || 24 Jan 2020 || 44 || align=left | Disc.: NEATAlt.: 2015 XT365 || 
|- id="2002 PB161" bgcolor=#FA8072
| – ||  || MCA || 18.2 || data-sort-value="0.96" | 960 m || single || 19 days || 27 Aug 2002 || 12 || align=left | Disc.: NEAT || 
|- id="2002 PG161" bgcolor=#d6d6d6
| 0 ||  || MBA-O || 16.2 || 3.2 km || multiple || 2002–2021 || 18 Jan 2021 || 117 || align=left | Disc.: NEAT || 
|- id="2002 PV161" bgcolor=#E9E9E9
| 0 ||  || MBA-M || 16.53 || 1.5 km || multiple || 2000–2021 || 18 Mar 2021 || 365 || align=left | Disc.: NEAT || 
|- id="2002 PB162" bgcolor=#d6d6d6
| 0 ||  || MBA-O || 16.35 || 3.0 km || multiple || 1994–2021 || 09 Feb 2021 || 147 || align=left | Disc.: NEATAlt.: 2014 WO476 || 
|- id="2002 PC162" bgcolor=#fefefe
| 0 ||  || MBA-I || 18.17 || data-sort-value="0.69" | 690 m || multiple || 1993–2021 || 29 Nov 2021 || 196 || align=left | Disc.: NEAT || 
|- id="2002 PE162" bgcolor=#fefefe
| 1 ||  || MBA-I || 18.0 || data-sort-value="0.75" | 750 m || multiple || 2002–2020 || 19 Jan 2020 || 115 || align=left | Disc.: NEAT || 
|- id="2002 PQ162" bgcolor=#fefefe
| 0 ||  || MBA-I || 18.7 || data-sort-value="0.54" | 540 m || multiple || 2002–2019 || 02 Jun 2019 || 82 || align=left | Disc.: NEAT || 
|- id="2002 PH163" bgcolor=#E9E9E9
| 0 ||  || MBA-M || 17.5 || 1.3 km || multiple || 2002–2020 || 09 Dec 2020 || 85 || align=left | Disc.: NEATAlt.: 2015 OD || 
|- id="2002 PB164" bgcolor=#d6d6d6
| 0 ||  || MBA-O || 16.5 || 2.8 km || multiple || 2002–2019 || 01 Oct 2019 || 52 || align=left | Disc.: NEAT || 
|- id="2002 PJ164" bgcolor=#d6d6d6
| 0 ||  || MBA-O || 16.1 || 3.4 km || multiple || 2002–2021 || 23 Jan 2021 || 86 || align=left | Disc.: NEAT || 
|- id="2002 PX164" bgcolor=#fefefe
| 0 ||  || MBA-I || 18.24 || data-sort-value="0.67" | 670 m || multiple || 2002–2021 || 07 Jul 2021 || 170 || align=left | Disc.: AMOS || 
|- id="2002 PN165" bgcolor=#E9E9E9
| 0 ||  || MBA-M || 17.8 || 1.5 km || multiple || 2002–2020 || 17 Sep 2020 || 61 || align=left | Disc.: NEAT || 
|- id="2002 PC166" bgcolor=#E9E9E9
| 2 ||  || MBA-M || 18.3 || data-sort-value="0.65" | 650 m || multiple || 2002–2018 || 07 Aug 2018 || 44 || align=left | Disc.: NEAT || 
|- id="2002 PM166" bgcolor=#E9E9E9
| 0 ||  || MBA-M || 17.8 || 1.2 km || multiple || 2002–2019 || 23 Sep 2019 || 53 || align=left | Disc.: NEAT || 
|- id="2002 PN166" bgcolor=#fefefe
| 0 ||  || MBA-I || 18.21 || data-sort-value="0.68" | 680 m || multiple || 2002–2022 || 25 Jan 2022 || 69 || align=left | Disc.: NEAT || 
|- id="2002 PV166" bgcolor=#d6d6d6
| 0 ||  || MBA-O || 16.4 || 2.9 km || multiple || 2002–2021 || 18 Jan 2021 || 101 || align=left | Disc.: AMOSAlt.: 2013 PC12 || 
|- id="2002 PX166" bgcolor=#FA8072
| 4 ||  || MCA || 19.8 || data-sort-value="0.33" | 330 m || single || 65 days || 13 Sep 2002 || 16 || align=left | Disc.: NEAT || 
|- id="2002 PD167" bgcolor=#d6d6d6
| 0 ||  || MBA-O || 16.5 || 2.8 km || multiple || 2002–2019 || 25 Oct 2019 || 67 || align=left | Disc.: NEAT || 
|- id="2002 PE167" bgcolor=#d6d6d6
| 0 ||  || MBA-O || 17.84 || 1.5 km || multiple || 2002–2021 || 08 Aug 2021 || 49 || align=left | Disc.: NEAT || 
|- id="2002 PZ167" bgcolor=#fefefe
| 0 ||  || MBA-I || 17.8 || data-sort-value="0.82" | 820 m || multiple || 2002–2021 || 15 Jan 2021 || 110 || align=left | Disc.: NEAT || 
|- id="2002 PH168" bgcolor=#d6d6d6
| 0 ||  || MBA-O || 16.1 || 3.4 km || multiple || 2002–2021 || 18 Jan 2021 || 92 || align=left | Disc.: NEAT || 
|- id="2002 PT168" bgcolor=#d6d6d6
| 0 ||  || MBA-O || 16.5 || 2.8 km || multiple || 2002–2020 || 17 Dec 2020 || 92 || align=left | Disc.: NEAT || 
|- id="2002 PH170" bgcolor=#E9E9E9
| 0 ||  || MBA-M || 17.7 || 1.2 km || multiple || 2002–2020 || 23 Nov 2020 || 78 || align=left | Disc.: NEAT || 
|- id="2002 PM170" bgcolor=#fefefe
| 0 ||  || MBA-I || 18.6 || data-sort-value="0.57" | 570 m || multiple || 2002–2019 || 24 Dec 2019 || 66 || align=left | Disc.: NEAT || 
|- id="2002 PN170" bgcolor=#fefefe
| 0 ||  || MBA-I || 18.43 || data-sort-value="0.61" | 610 m || multiple || 2002–2021 || 26 Nov 2021 || 92 || align=left | Disc.: NEAT || 
|- id="2002 PO170" bgcolor=#fefefe
| 0 ||  || MBA-I || 19.06 || data-sort-value="0.46" | 460 m || multiple || 2002–2021 || 09 May 2021 || 76 || align=left | Disc.: NEATAlt.: 2008 GV22 || 
|- id="2002 PQ170" bgcolor=#d6d6d6
| 0 ||  || MBA-O || 16.7 || 2.5 km || multiple || 2002–2020 || 19 Jan 2020 || 60 || align=left | Disc.: NEATAlt.: 2013 RL23 || 
|- id="2002 PR170" bgcolor=#C2E0FF
| 5 ||  || TNO || 7.04 || 153 km || multiple || 2002–2017 || 17 Sep 2017 || 27 || align=left | Disc.: Mauna Kea Obs.LoUTNOs, centaur || 
|- id="2002 PS170" bgcolor=#C2E0FF
| E ||  || TNO || 7.8 || 95 km || single || 30 days || 04 Sep 2002 || 8 || align=left | Disc.: Mauna Kea Obs.LoUTNOs, cubewano? || 
|- id="2002 PU170" bgcolor=#C2E0FF
| 3 ||  || TNO || 7.1 || 138 km || multiple || 2002–2014 || 26 Sep 2014 || 25 || align=left | Disc.: Mauna Kea Obs.LoUTNOs, twotino || 
|- id="2002 PV170" bgcolor=#C2E0FF
| 2 ||  || TNO || 6.29 || 183 km || multiple || 2002–2021 || 05 Oct 2021 || 252 || align=left | Disc.: Mauna Kea Obs.LoUTNOs, cubewano (cold) || 
|- id="2002 PX170" bgcolor=#C2E0FF
| 4 ||  || TNO || 7.3 || 115 km || multiple || 2002–2019 || 27 Sep 2019 || 31 || align=left | Disc.: Mauna Kea Obs.LoUTNOs, cubewano (cold)Alt.: 2003 QZ113 || 
|- id="2002 PY170" bgcolor=#C2E0FF
| 3 ||  || TNO || 7.7 || 96 km || multiple || 2002–2014 || 29 Jul 2014 || 15 || align=left | Disc.: Mauna Kea Obs.LoUTNOs, cubewano (cold) || 
|- id="2002 PZ170" bgcolor=#C2E0FF
| E ||  || TNO || 7.8 || 95 km || single || 30 days || 04 Sep 2002 || 8 || align=left | Disc.: Mauna Kea Obs.LoUTNOs, cubewano? || 
|- id="2002 PA171" bgcolor=#C2E0FF
| 3 ||  || TNO || 6.8 || 145 km || multiple || 2002–2013 || 07 Oct 2013 || 18 || align=left | Disc.: Mauna Kea Obs.LoUTNOs, cubewano (cold) || 
|- id="2002 PC171" bgcolor=#C2E0FF
| 3 ||  || TNO || 7.6 || 100 km || multiple || 2002–2015 || 08 Nov 2015 || 22 || align=left | Disc.: Mauna Kea Obs.LoUTNOs, cubewano (cold) || 
|- id="2002 PJ172" bgcolor=#fefefe
| 0 ||  || MBA-I || 18.99 || data-sort-value="0.47" | 470 m || multiple || 2002–2021 || 25 Nov 2021 || 123 || align=left | Disc.: NEAT || 
|- id="2002 PN172" bgcolor=#E9E9E9
| 0 ||  || MBA-M || 17.6 || data-sort-value="0.90" | 900 m || multiple || 2002–2019 || 28 Nov 2019 || 109 || align=left | Disc.: NEAT || 
|- id="2002 PS172" bgcolor=#fefefe
| 3 ||  || MBA-I || 18.8 || data-sort-value="0.52" | 520 m || multiple || 2002–2013 || 30 Aug 2013 || 27 || align=left | Disc.: NEATAlt.: 2013 QF63 || 
|- id="2002 PZ172" bgcolor=#fefefe
| 0 ||  || MBA-I || 18.74 || data-sort-value="0.53" | 530 m || multiple || 2002–2021 || 10 Sep 2021 || 34 || align=left | Disc.: NEAT || 
|- id="2002 PC173" bgcolor=#fefefe
| 0 ||  || MBA-I || 18.8 || data-sort-value="0.52" | 520 m || multiple || 2002–2020 || 19 Oct 2020 || 79 || align=left | Disc.: NEAT || 
|- id="2002 PS173" bgcolor=#E9E9E9
| 0 ||  || MBA-M || 17.6 || data-sort-value="0.90" | 900 m || multiple || 2002–2020 || 27 Jan 2020 || 73 || align=left | Disc.: NEATAlt.: 2014 OU161 || 
|- id="2002 PA174" bgcolor=#E9E9E9
| 1 ||  || MBA-M || 18.5 || data-sort-value="0.84" | 840 m || multiple || 2002–2019 || 27 Oct 2019 || 73 || align=left | Disc.: NEATAlt.: 2015 RG286 || 
|- id="2002 PQ174" bgcolor=#fefefe
| 2 ||  || MBA-I || 18.1 || data-sort-value="0.71" | 710 m || multiple || 2002–2020 || 14 Jun 2020 || 50 || align=left | Disc.: NEAT || 
|- id="2002 PX174" bgcolor=#E9E9E9
| 2 ||  || MBA-M || 17.9 || data-sort-value="0.78" | 780 m || multiple || 2002–2020 || 04 Jan 2020 || 26 || align=left | Disc.: NEAT || 
|- id="2002 PB175" bgcolor=#fefefe
| 0 ||  || MBA-I || 17.6 || data-sort-value="0.90" | 900 m || multiple || 2002–2021 || 06 Jan 2021 || 120 || align=left | Disc.: NEAT || 
|- id="2002 PE175" bgcolor=#E9E9E9
| 0 ||  || MBA-M || 16.90 || 1.2 km || multiple || 2000–2021 || 07 Apr 2021 || 216 || align=left | Disc.: NEATAlt.: 2011 YV26 || 
|- id="2002 PJ175" bgcolor=#d6d6d6
| 0 ||  || MBA-O || 16.18 || 3.2 km || multiple || 2002–2021 || 14 Apr 2021 || 179 || align=left | Disc.: NEATAlt.: 2016 EJ67 || 
|- id="2002 PL175" bgcolor=#E9E9E9
| 0 ||  || MBA-M || 17.4 || 1.4 km || multiple || 1998–2021 || 15 Jan 2021 || 168 || align=left | Disc.: NEATAlt.: 2011 YE3 || 
|- id="2002 PO175" bgcolor=#d6d6d6
| 0 ||  || HIL || 15.8 || 4.1 km || multiple || 2002–2021 || 16 Jan 2021 || 66 || align=left | Disc.: NEATAlt.: 2010 KV77 || 
|- id="2002 PS175" bgcolor=#E9E9E9
| 0 ||  || MBA-M || 17.64 || 1.2 km || multiple || 2002–2022 || 26 Jan 2022 || 64 || align=left | Disc.: NEAT || 
|- id="2002 PV175" bgcolor=#fefefe
| 0 ||  || MBA-I || 17.1 || 1.1 km || multiple || 2002–2020 || 03 Jan 2020 || 75 || align=left | Disc.: NEAT || 
|- id="2002 PY175" bgcolor=#d6d6d6
| 0 ||  || MBA-O || 16.69 || 2.6 km || multiple || 2002–2021 || 11 Apr 2021 || 97 || align=left | Disc.: NEAT || 
|- id="2002 PF176" bgcolor=#fefefe
| 0 ||  || MBA-I || 18.75 || data-sort-value="0.53" | 530 m || multiple || 2002–2021 || 17 Apr 2021 || 55 || align=left | Disc.: NEATAlt.: 2011 CD113 || 
|- id="2002 PH176" bgcolor=#E9E9E9
| 0 ||  || MBA-M || 16.8 || 1.3 km || multiple || 2002–2020 || 23 Jan 2020 || 131 || align=left | Disc.: NEATAlt.: 2015 YS19 || 
|- id="2002 PJ176" bgcolor=#E9E9E9
| 0 ||  || MBA-M || 18.3 || data-sort-value="0.92" | 920 m || multiple || 2002–2019 || 28 Sep 2019 || 48 || align=left | Disc.: NEAT || 
|- id="2002 PN176" bgcolor=#d6d6d6
| 0 ||  || MBA-O || 16.7 || 2.5 km || multiple || 1997–2019 || 21 Dec 2019 || 70 || align=left | Disc.: NEAT || 
|- id="2002 PO176" bgcolor=#fefefe
| 0 ||  || MBA-I || 18.99 || data-sort-value="0.47" | 470 m || multiple || 2002–2021 || 11 Oct 2021 || 54 || align=left | Disc.: NEATAlt.: 2017 OG43 || 
|- id="2002 PP176" bgcolor=#E9E9E9
| 0 ||  || MBA-M || 17.40 || 1.8 km || multiple || 2002–2021 || 26 Oct 2021 || 116 || align=left | Disc.: NEAT || 
|- id="2002 PY176" bgcolor=#E9E9E9
| 0 ||  || MBA-M || 18.1 || data-sort-value="0.71" | 710 m || multiple || 1994–2020 || 23 Jan 2020 || 82 || align=left | Disc.: NEATAlt.: 2015 XE382 || 
|- id="2002 PA177" bgcolor=#E9E9E9
| 0 ||  || MBA-M || 17.5 || 1.8 km || multiple || 2002–2020 || 15 Dec 2020 || 116 || align=left | Disc.: NEATAlt.: 2011 QG86 || 
|- id="2002 PB177" bgcolor=#E9E9E9
| 0 ||  || MBA-M || 16.76 || 1.3 km || multiple || 2002–2021 || 20 May 2021 || 179 || align=left | Disc.: NEATAlt.: 2013 HP4, 2015 XQ382, 2017 DV103 || 
|- id="2002 PC177" bgcolor=#fefefe
| 1 ||  || MBA-I || 19.1 || data-sort-value="0.45" | 450 m || multiple || 2002–2019 || 29 Jul 2019 || 44 || align=left | Disc.: NEAT || 
|- id="2002 PT177" bgcolor=#E9E9E9
| 1 ||  || MBA-M || 17.3 || 1.5 km || multiple || 2002–2020 || 16 Dec 2020 || 92 || align=left | Disc.: NEATAlt.: 2015 RC86 || 
|- id="2002 PW178" bgcolor=#E9E9E9
| 0 ||  || MBA-M || 17.14 || 2.1 km || multiple || 2002–2021 || 28 Nov 2021 || 121 || align=left | Disc.: NEAT || 
|- id="2002 PC179" bgcolor=#fefefe
| 0 ||  || MBA-I || 17.6 || data-sort-value="0.90" | 900 m || multiple || 2002–2021 || 02 Jun 2021 || 112 || align=left | Disc.: NEATAlt.: 2008 CB111 || 
|- id="2002 PL179" bgcolor=#FA8072
| 2 ||  || MCA || 19.5 || data-sort-value="0.37" | 370 m || multiple || 2002–2021 || 23 Nov 2021 || 47 || align=left | Disc.: NEAT || 
|- id="2002 PN179" bgcolor=#d6d6d6
| 0 ||  || MBA-O || 16.4 || 2.9 km || multiple || 2002–2020 || 12 Apr 2020 || 118 || align=left | Disc.: NEAT || 
|- id="2002 PO179" bgcolor=#fefefe
| 0 ||  || MBA-I || 18.3 || data-sort-value="0.65" | 650 m || multiple || 2002–2020 || 20 Dec 2020 || 60 || align=left | Disc.: NEAT || 
|- id="2002 PP179" bgcolor=#E9E9E9
| 3 ||  || MBA-M || 18.4 || data-sort-value="0.88" | 880 m || multiple || 2002–2015 || 02 Oct 2015 || 26 || align=left | Disc.: NEAT || 
|- id="2002 PE180" bgcolor=#E9E9E9
| 2 ||  || MBA-M || 18.4 || data-sort-value="0.88" | 880 m || multiple || 2002–2020 || 13 Nov 2020 || 72 || align=left | Disc.: NEAT || 
|- id="2002 PG180" bgcolor=#d6d6d6
| 1 ||  || MBA-O || 17.2 || 2.0 km || multiple || 2002–2020 || 07 Dec 2020 || 42 || align=left | Disc.: NEAT || 
|- id="2002 PH180" bgcolor=#E9E9E9
| – ||  || MBA-M || 18.6 || data-sort-value="0.57" | 570 m || single || 28 days || 26 Aug 2002 || 14 || align=left | Disc.: NEAT || 
|- id="2002 PJ180" bgcolor=#FA8072
| – ||  || MCA || 19.9 || data-sort-value="0.31" | 310 m || single || 29 days || 27 Aug 2002 || 11 || align=left | Disc.: NEAT || 
|- id="2002 PM180" bgcolor=#E9E9E9
| 0 ||  || MBA-M || 17.9 || 1.1 km || multiple || 2002–2020 || 17 Dec 2020 || 40 || align=left | Disc.: NEATAlt.: 2015 PX77 || 
|- id="2002 PO180" bgcolor=#E9E9E9
| 1 ||  || MBA-M || 18.03 || data-sort-value="0.74" | 740 m || multiple || 2002–2021 || 15 Apr 2021 || 23 || align=left | Disc.: NEAT || 
|- id="2002 PQ180" bgcolor=#fefefe
| 0 ||  || MBA-I || 19.21 || data-sort-value="0.43" | 430 m || multiple || 2002–2021 || 27 Sep 2021 || 92 || align=left | Disc.: NEAT || 
|- id="2002 PX180" bgcolor=#fefefe
| 0 ||  || MBA-I || 18.5 || data-sort-value="0.59" | 590 m || multiple || 2002–2020 || 16 Sep 2020 || 98 || align=left | Disc.: NEAT || 
|- id="2002 PE181" bgcolor=#E9E9E9
| 0 ||  || MBA-M || 17.5 || data-sort-value="0.94" | 940 m || multiple || 2002–2019 || 02 Nov 2019 || 63 || align=left | Disc.: NEAT || 
|- id="2002 PK181" bgcolor=#d6d6d6
| – ||  || MBA-O || 17.8 || 1.5 km || single || 39 days || 30 Aug 2002 || 16 || align=left | Disc.: NEAT || 
|- id="2002 PT181" bgcolor=#E9E9E9
| 0 ||  || MBA-M || 17.5 || data-sort-value="0.94" | 940 m || multiple || 2002–2019 || 25 Nov 2019 || 76 || align=left | Disc.: NEAT || 
|- id="2002 PW181" bgcolor=#d6d6d6
| 3 ||  || MBA-O || 17.4 || 1.8 km || multiple || 2002–2019 || 25 Oct 2019 || 27 || align=left | Disc.: NEAT || 
|- id="2002 PZ181" bgcolor=#d6d6d6
| 0 ||  || MBA-O || 17.3 || 1.9 km || multiple || 2002–2018 || 08 Nov 2018 || 47 || align=left | Disc.: NEAT || 
|- id="2002 PC182" bgcolor=#fefefe
| 0 ||  || MBA-I || 18.4 || data-sort-value="0.62" | 620 m || multiple || 2002–2019 || 23 Sep 2019 || 84 || align=left | Disc.: NEAT || 
|- id="2002 PD182" bgcolor=#FA8072
| – ||  || MCA || 19.8 || data-sort-value="0.33" | 330 m || single || 46 days || 29 Aug 2002 || 22 || align=left | Disc.: NEAT || 
|- id="2002 PF182" bgcolor=#fefefe
| 0 ||  || MBA-I || 18.7 || data-sort-value="0.54" | 540 m || multiple || 2002–2019 || 25 Sep 2019 || 59 || align=left | Disc.: NEATAlt.: 2012 JA67, 2015 DY22 || 
|- id="2002 PG182" bgcolor=#fefefe
| 0 ||  || HUN || 18.99 || data-sort-value="0.47" | 470 m || multiple || 2002–2021 || 10 May 2021 || 40 || align=left | Disc.: NEATAlt.: 2016 NP30 || 
|- id="2002 PL182" bgcolor=#FA8072
| 2 ||  || MCA || 19.1 || data-sort-value="0.45" | 450 m || multiple || 2002–2019 || 24 Oct 2019 || 65 || align=left | Disc.: Cerro Tololo || 
|- id="2002 PM182" bgcolor=#fefefe
| 0 ||  || MBA-I || 18.1 || data-sort-value="0.71" | 710 m || multiple || 1994–2021 || 24 Jan 2021 || 112 || align=left | Disc.: NEATAlt.: 2015 KP38 || 
|- id="2002 PQ182" bgcolor=#fefefe
| 0 ||  || MBA-I || 18.77 || data-sort-value="0.52" | 520 m || multiple || 2002–2021 || 19 May 2021 || 94 || align=left | Disc.: NEATAlt.: 2012 TM96 || 
|- id="2002 PV182" bgcolor=#d6d6d6
| 0 ||  || MBA-O || 16.6 || 2.7 km || multiple || 2002–2021 || 09 Jan 2021 || 98 || align=left | Disc.: NEAT || 
|- id="2002 PF183" bgcolor=#E9E9E9
| 0 ||  || MBA-M || 17.20 || 2.0 km || multiple || 2002–2021 || 28 Oct 2021 || 102 || align=left | Disc.: NEATAdded on 24 August 2020 || 
|- id="2002 PU183" bgcolor=#d6d6d6
| 0 ||  || MBA-O || 17.0 || 2.2 km || multiple || 2002–2020 || 01 Feb 2020 || 91 || align=left | Disc.: NEATAlt.: 2016 GC219 || 
|- id="2002 PY183" bgcolor=#fefefe
| 1 ||  || MBA-I || 17.9 || data-sort-value="0.78" | 780 m || multiple || 2002–2019 || 04 Apr 2019 || 64 || align=left | Disc.: NEAT || 
|- id="2002 PZ183" bgcolor=#E9E9E9
| – ||  || MBA-M || 17.3 || 1.0 km || single || 40 days || 26 Aug 2002 || 17 || align=left | Disc.: NEAT || 
|- id="2002 PA184" bgcolor=#fefefe
| 0 ||  || MBA-I || 17.7 || data-sort-value="0.86" | 860 m || multiple || 2002–2020 || 16 Nov 2020 || 178 || align=left | Disc.: NEAT || 
|- id="2002 PC184" bgcolor=#E9E9E9
| 0 ||  || MBA-M || 17.9 || 1.1 km || multiple || 2002–2020 || 10 Dec 2020 || 73 || align=left | Disc.: NEAT || 
|- id="2002 PG184" bgcolor=#E9E9E9
| 0 ||  || MBA-M || 17.63 || data-sort-value="0.89" | 890 m || multiple || 2002–2021 || 10 Apr 2021 || 88 || align=left | Disc.: NEATAlt.: 2013 HH46 || 
|- id="2002 PJ184" bgcolor=#d6d6d6
| 0 ||  || MBA-O || 17.27 || 2.0 km || multiple || 2002–2021 || 30 Jun 2021 || 71 || align=left | Disc.: NEATAlt.: 2017 QC61 || 
|- id="2002 PM184" bgcolor=#fefefe
| 0 ||  || MBA-I || 17.81 || data-sort-value="0.81" | 810 m || multiple || 2002–2021 || 17 Jun 2021 || 84 || align=left | Disc.: NEAT || 
|- id="2002 PQ184" bgcolor=#E9E9E9
| – ||  || MBA-M || 18.8 || data-sort-value="0.73" | 730 m || single || 19 days || 27 Aug 2002 || 10 || align=left | Disc.: NEAT || 
|- id="2002 PR184" bgcolor=#fefefe
| 0 ||  || MBA-I || 18.56 || data-sort-value="0.58" | 580 m || multiple || 1995–2022 || 25 Jan 2022 || 46 || align=left | Disc.: NEAT || 
|- id="2002 PT184" bgcolor=#E9E9E9
| 0 ||  || MBA-M || 17.6 || 1.3 km || multiple || 2002–2019 || 26 Nov 2019 || 151 || align=left | Disc.: NEAT || 
|- id="2002 PU184" bgcolor=#d6d6d6
| 2 ||  || MBA-O || 16.8 || 2.4 km || multiple || 2002–2019 || 27 Sep 2019 || 44 || align=left | Disc.: NEAT || 
|- id="2002 PZ184" bgcolor=#fefefe
| 1 ||  || MBA-I || 19.0 || data-sort-value="0.47" | 470 m || multiple || 2002–2019 || 30 Jun 2019 || 60 || align=left | Disc.: NEAT || 
|- id="2002 PB185" bgcolor=#E9E9E9
| 0 ||  || MBA-M || 17.39 || data-sort-value="0.99" | 990 m || multiple || 2002–2021 || 08 May 2021 || 146 || align=left | Disc.: NEAT || 
|- id="2002 PE185" bgcolor=#d6d6d6
| 0 ||  || MBA-O || 18.1 || 1.3 km || multiple || 1997–2018 || 14 Aug 2018 || 49 || align=left | Disc.: NEAT || 
|- id="2002 PO185" bgcolor=#d6d6d6
| 0 ||  || MBA-O || 16.34 || 3.0 km || multiple || 2002–2022 || 07 Jan 2022 || 103 || align=left | Disc.: NEAT || 
|- id="2002 PP185" bgcolor=#fefefe
| 0 ||  || MBA-I || 17.7 || data-sort-value="0.86" | 860 m || multiple || 2002–2021 || 06 Jan 2021 || 173 || align=left | Disc.: NEATAlt.: 2011 BZ101 || 
|- id="2002 PR185" bgcolor=#E9E9E9
| 0 ||  || MBA-M || 17.90 || data-sort-value="0.78" | 780 m || multiple || 2002–2021 || 04 Apr 2021 || 93 || align=left | Disc.: NEAT || 
|- id="2002 PT185" bgcolor=#d6d6d6
| 0 ||  || MBA-O || 16.84 || 2.4 km || multiple || 2002–2021 || 03 May 2021 || 94 || align=left | Disc.: NEATAlt.: 2013 WZ51 || 
|- id="2002 PU185" bgcolor=#d6d6d6
| 0 ||  || MBA-O || 17.2 || 2.0 km || multiple || 2002–2019 || 03 Jan 2019 || 91 || align=left | Disc.: NEAT || 
|- id="2002 PW185" bgcolor=#E9E9E9
| 0 ||  || MBA-M || 17.19 || 2.0 km || multiple || 2002–2021 || 04 Dec 2021 || 99 || align=left | Disc.: NEAT || 
|- id="2002 PX185" bgcolor=#d6d6d6
| 0 ||  || MBA-O || 16.5 || 2.8 km || multiple || 2002–2019 || 24 Oct 2019 || 74 || align=left | Disc.: NEAT || 
|- id="2002 PZ185" bgcolor=#fefefe
| 0 ||  || MBA-I || 18.47 || data-sort-value="0.60" | 600 m || multiple || 2002–2022 || 25 Jan 2022 || 57 || align=left | Disc.: NEAT || 
|- id="2002 PD186" bgcolor=#E9E9E9
| 0 ||  || MBA-M || 16.80 || 1.3 km || multiple || 2002–2021 || 13 Apr 2021 || 143 || align=left | Disc.: NEAT || 
|- id="2002 PN186" bgcolor=#E9E9E9
| 1 ||  || MBA-M || 17.9 || 1.5 km || multiple || 2002–2020 || 17 Oct 2020 || 48 || align=left | Disc.: NEAT || 
|- id="2002 PS186" bgcolor=#fefefe
| 0 ||  || MBA-I || 18.58 || data-sort-value="0.57" | 570 m || multiple || 2002–2021 || 03 May 2021 || 51 || align=left | Disc.: NEAT || 
|- id="2002 PW186" bgcolor=#E9E9E9
| 0 ||  || MBA-M || 17.6 || data-sort-value="0.90" | 900 m || multiple || 2002–2019 || 19 Nov 2019 || 85 || align=left | Disc.: NEAT || 
|- id="2002 PZ186" bgcolor=#fefefe
| 0 ||  || MBA-I || 18.1 || data-sort-value="0.71" | 710 m || multiple || 2001–2021 || 18 Jan 2021 || 78 || align=left | Disc.: NEAT || 
|- id="2002 PE187" bgcolor=#E9E9E9
| 1 ||  || MBA-M || 18.1 || 1.0 km || multiple || 2002–2019 || 28 Nov 2019 || 92 || align=left | Disc.: NEAT || 
|- id="2002 PJ187" bgcolor=#E9E9E9
| 0 ||  || MBA-M || 17.8 || 1.2 km || multiple || 2002–2019 || 29 Oct 2019 || 82 || align=left | Disc.: NEATAlt.: 2010 GE118 || 
|- id="2002 PL187" bgcolor=#d6d6d6
| 0 ||  || MBA-O || 16.6 || 2.7 km || multiple || 2002–2019 || 22 Oct 2019 || 46 || align=left | Disc.: NEAT || 
|- id="2002 PM187" bgcolor=#E9E9E9
| 0 ||  || MBA-M || 17.4 || data-sort-value="0.98" | 980 m || multiple || 2002–2020 || 27 Jan 2020 || 104 || align=left | Disc.: NEAT || 
|- id="2002 PV187" bgcolor=#E9E9E9
| 0 ||  || MBA-M || 17.3 || 1.0 km || multiple || 2002–2021 || 12 Feb 2021 || 63 || align=left | Disc.: NEAT || 
|- id="2002 PE188" bgcolor=#fefefe
| 0 ||  || MBA-I || 18.7 || data-sort-value="0.54" | 540 m || multiple || 2002–2021 || 10 Apr 2021 || 54 || align=left | Disc.: NEAT || 
|- id="2002 PG188" bgcolor=#E9E9E9
| 2 ||  || MBA-M || 18.0 || data-sort-value="0.75" | 750 m || multiple || 2002–2019 || 23 Oct 2019 || 32 || align=left | Disc.: NEAT || 
|- id="2002 PH188" bgcolor=#fefefe
| 1 ||  || MBA-I || 19.0 || data-sort-value="0.47" | 470 m || multiple || 2002–2018 || 08 Aug 2018 || 63 || align=left | Disc.: NEAT || 
|- id="2002 PM188" bgcolor=#d6d6d6
| 0 ||  || MBA-O || 17.3 || 1.9 km || multiple || 2002–2018 || 08 Aug 2018 || 54 || align=left | Disc.: NEATAlt.: 2013 TH13 || 
|- id="2002 PP188" bgcolor=#E9E9E9
| 1 ||  || MBA-M || 18.1 || 1.0 km || multiple || 2002–2019 || 28 Oct 2019 || 83 || align=left | Disc.: NEAT || 
|- id="2002 PW188" bgcolor=#E9E9E9
| 0 ||  || MBA-M || 17.7 || data-sort-value="0.86" | 860 m || multiple || 2002–2018 || 14 Aug 2018 || 66 || align=left | Disc.: NEAT || 
|- id="2002 PB189" bgcolor=#d6d6d6
| 0 ||  || MBA-O || 16.84 || 2.4 km || multiple || 2002–2022 || 27 Jan 2022 || 67 || align=left | Disc.: NEAT || 
|- id="2002 PC189" bgcolor=#fefefe
| 0 ||  || MBA-I || 18.49 || data-sort-value="0.60" | 600 m || multiple || 2002–2021 || 04 Apr 2021 || 72 || align=left | Disc.: NEAT || 
|- id="2002 PF189" bgcolor=#fefefe
| 0 ||  || HUN || 18.2 || data-sort-value="0.68" | 680 m || multiple || 2002–2021 || 13 Jan 2021 || 90 || align=left | Disc.: NEAT || 
|- id="2002 PK189" bgcolor=#fefefe
| 0 ||  || MBA-I || 18.6 || data-sort-value="0.57" | 570 m || multiple || 2002–2018 || 24 Apr 2018 || 49 || align=left | Disc.: NEAT || 
|- id="2002 PM189" bgcolor=#FA8072
| 0 ||  || MCA || 19.40 || data-sort-value="0.39" | 390 m || multiple || 2002–2021 || 12 Nov 2021 || 65 || align=left | Disc.: NEATAlt.: 2021 RT30 || 
|- id="2002 PN189" bgcolor=#E9E9E9
| 2 ||  || MBA-M || 18.6 || data-sort-value="0.80" | 800 m || multiple || 2002–2020 || 20 Dec 2020 || 57 || align=left | Disc.: NEAT || 
|- id="2002 PP189" bgcolor=#E9E9E9
| 0 ||  || MBA-M || 17.0 || 1.7 km || multiple || 2002–2021 || 18 Jan 2021 || 168 || align=left | Disc.: NEAT || 
|- id="2002 PW189" bgcolor=#E9E9E9
| 0 ||  || MBA-M || 17.8 || data-sort-value="0.82" | 820 m || multiple || 2002–2019 || 23 Oct 2019 || 66 || align=left | Disc.: NEATAlt.: 2011 WW11 || 
|- id="2002 PX189" bgcolor=#d6d6d6
| 2 ||  || MBA-O || 17.3 || 1.9 km || multiple || 2002–2019 || 24 Sep 2019 || 28 || align=left | Disc.: NEAT || 
|- id="2002 PE190" bgcolor=#d6d6d6
| 0 ||  || MBA-O || 16.25 || 3.1 km || multiple || 2002–2021 || 17 Apr 2021 || 121 || align=left | Disc.: NEATAlt.: 2013 WS87 || 
|- id="2002 PH190" bgcolor=#fefefe
| 0 ||  || MBA-I || 17.7 || data-sort-value="0.86" | 860 m || multiple || 2002–2020 || 12 Dec 2020 || 185 || align=left | Disc.: NEAT || 
|- id="2002 PJ190" bgcolor=#E9E9E9
| 0 ||  || MBA-M || 17.6 || data-sort-value="0.90" | 900 m || multiple || 2002–2019 || 19 Dec 2019 || 57 || align=left | Disc.: NEAT || 
|- id="2002 PL190" bgcolor=#fefefe
| 3 ||  || MBA-I || 18.9 || data-sort-value="0.49" | 490 m || multiple || 2002–2016 || 25 Oct 2016 || 21 || align=left | Disc.: NEATAlt.: 2009 SG308 || 
|- id="2002 PW190" bgcolor=#E9E9E9
| 0 ||  || MBA-M || 17.3 || 1.5 km || multiple || 2002–2020 || 07 Dec 2020 || 109 || align=left | Disc.: NEAT || 
|- id="2002 PX190" bgcolor=#E9E9E9
| 2 ||  || MBA-M || 18.3 || data-sort-value="0.65" | 650 m || multiple || 2002–2020 || 26 Jan 2020 || 42 || align=left | Disc.: NEAT || 
|- id="2002 PZ190" bgcolor=#FA8072
| 1 ||  || MCA || 18.7 || data-sort-value="0.54" | 540 m || multiple || 2002–2018 || 03 Oct 2018 || 99 || align=left | Disc.: NEAT || 
|- id="2002 PB191" bgcolor=#E9E9E9
| 0 ||  || MBA-M || 17.18 || 2.0 km || multiple || 2002–2021 || 23 Nov 2021 || 115 || align=left | Disc.: NEAT || 
|- id="2002 PG191" bgcolor=#E9E9E9
| 0 ||  || MBA-M || 16.81 || 2.4 km || multiple || 2000–2021 || 05 Nov 2021 || 179 || align=left | Disc.: NEAT || 
|- id="2002 PL191" bgcolor=#d6d6d6
| 1 ||  || MBA-O || 16.8 || 2.4 km || multiple || 2002–2018 || 03 Nov 2018 || 40 || align=left | Disc.: NEAT || 
|- id="2002 PN191" bgcolor=#d6d6d6
| 0 ||  || MBA-O || 16.5 || 2.8 km || multiple || 2002–2020 || 19 Oct 2020 || 83 || align=left | Disc.: NEAT || 
|- id="2002 PQ191" bgcolor=#fefefe
| 1 ||  || MBA-I || 18.3 || data-sort-value="0.65" | 650 m || multiple || 2002–2017 || 15 Nov 2017 || 43 || align=left | Disc.: NEAT || 
|- id="2002 PS191" bgcolor=#E9E9E9
| 0 ||  || MBA-M || 17.2 || 2.0 km || multiple || 2002–2020 || 15 Oct 2020 || 162 || align=left | Disc.: NEATAlt.: 2011 ON23 || 
|- id="2002 PU191" bgcolor=#E9E9E9
| 0 ||  || MBA-M || 17.2 || 1.1 km || multiple || 2002–2021 || 23 Jan 2021 || 97 || align=left | Disc.: NEATAlt.: 2013 CJ172 || 
|- id="2002 PY191" bgcolor=#fefefe
| 0 ||  || MBA-I || 18.22 || data-sort-value="0.67" | 670 m || multiple || 2002–2020 || 16 Dec 2020 || 109 || align=left | Disc.: NEAT || 
|- id="2002 PB192" bgcolor=#fefefe
| 0 ||  || HUN || 18.99 || data-sort-value="0.47" | 470 m || multiple || 2002–2022 || 27 Jan 2022 || 76 || align=left | Disc.: NEAT || 
|- id="2002 PE192" bgcolor=#d6d6d6
| 0 ||  || MBA-O || 16.3 || 3.1 km || multiple || 2002–2020 || 24 Jan 2020 || 96 || align=left | Disc.: NEAT || 
|- id="2002 PF192" bgcolor=#fefefe
| 0 ||  || MBA-I || 18.76 || data-sort-value="0.53" | 530 m || multiple || 2002–2021 || 08 Jul 2021 || 77 || align=left | Disc.: NEAT || 
|- id="2002 PJ192" bgcolor=#E9E9E9
| 3 ||  || MBA-M || 18.2 || data-sort-value="0.68" | 680 m || multiple || 2001–2014 || 30 Jun 2014 || 31 || align=left | Disc.: Kitt Peak Obs.Alt.: 2001 FX204 || 
|- id="2002 PM192" bgcolor=#fefefe
| 0 ||  || MBA-I || 17.79 || data-sort-value="0.82" | 820 m || multiple || 2002–2021 || 31 Oct 2021 || 114 || align=left | Disc.: NEAT || 
|- id="2002 PQ192" bgcolor=#d6d6d6
| 0 ||  || MBA-O || 16.5 || 2.8 km || multiple || 2002–2020 || 14 Feb 2020 || 139 || align=left | Disc.: NEATAlt.: 2013 TJ133 || 
|- id="2002 PR192" bgcolor=#d6d6d6
| 0 ||  || MBA-O || 16.5 || 2.8 km || multiple || 2002–2019 || 17 Dec 2019 || 62 || align=left | Disc.: NEAT || 
|- id="2002 PW192" bgcolor=#E9E9E9
| 2 ||  || MBA-M || 18.4 || data-sort-value="0.62" | 620 m || multiple || 1998–2018 || 08 Jul 2018 || 47 || align=left | Disc.: NEAT || 
|- id="2002 PY192" bgcolor=#fefefe
| – ||  || HUN || 19.8 || data-sort-value="0.33" | 330 m || single || 44 days || 21 Sep 2002 || 17 || align=left | Disc.: NEAT || 
|- id="2002 PZ192" bgcolor=#fefefe
| 2 ||  || MBA-I || 19.0 || data-sort-value="0.47" | 470 m || multiple || 2002–2020 || 17 Nov 2020 || 98 || align=left | Disc.: NEAT || 
|- id="2002 PA193" bgcolor=#fefefe
| 2 ||  || MBA-I || 18.7 || data-sort-value="0.54" | 540 m || multiple || 2002–2020 || 11 Dec 2020 || 47 || align=left | Disc.: NEAT || 
|- id="2002 PD193" bgcolor=#E9E9E9
| 0 ||  || MBA-M || 16.92 || 2.3 km || multiple || 2002–2021 || 08 Dec 2021 || 164 || align=left | Disc.: NEAT || 
|- id="2002 PE193" bgcolor=#fefefe
| 0 ||  || MBA-I || 18.76 || data-sort-value="0.53" | 530 m || multiple || 2002–2022 || 25 Jan 2022 || 45 || align=left | Disc.: NEAT || 
|- id="2002 PH193" bgcolor=#E9E9E9
| 3 ||  || MBA-M || 18.2 || data-sort-value="0.68" | 680 m || multiple || 2002–2018 || 08 Aug 2018 || 44 || align=left | Disc.: NEAT || 
|- id="2002 PP193" bgcolor=#E9E9E9
| 0 ||  || MBA-M || 17.6 || 1.7 km || multiple || 2002–2020 || 06 Dec 2020 || 134 || align=left | Disc.: AMOSAlt.: 2007 VN331 || 
|- id="2002 PQ193" bgcolor=#d6d6d6
| 0 ||  || MBA-O || 16.7 || 2.5 km || multiple || 2002–2020 || 07 Dec 2020 || 96 || align=left | Disc.: AMOS || 
|- id="2002 PS193" bgcolor=#fefefe
| 0 ||  || MBA-I || 18.30 || data-sort-value="0.65" | 650 m || multiple || 2002–2021 || 11 May 2021 || 144 || align=left | Disc.: AMOS || 
|- id="2002 PT193" bgcolor=#E9E9E9
| 0 ||  || MBA-M || 16.6 || 2.0 km || multiple || 2002–2021 || 16 Jan 2021 || 258 || align=left | Disc.: AMOS || 
|- id="2002 PW193" bgcolor=#fefefe
| 0 ||  || MBA-I || 18.3 || data-sort-value="0.65" | 650 m || multiple || 1995–2016 || 25 Nov 2016 || 70 || align=left | Disc.: NEAT || 
|- id="2002 PY193" bgcolor=#E9E9E9
| 0 ||  || MBA-M || 17.6 || data-sort-value="0.90" | 900 m || multiple || 2002–2020 || 27 Feb 2020 || 68 || align=left | Disc.: NEAT || 
|- id="2002 PZ193" bgcolor=#fefefe
| 0 ||  || MBA-I || 17.9 || data-sort-value="0.78" | 780 m || multiple || 2002–2020 || 12 Dec 2020 || 72 || align=left | Disc.: NEAT || 
|- id="2002 PC194" bgcolor=#E9E9E9
| 0 ||  || MBA-M || 18.1 || 1.0 km || multiple || 1998–2019 || 01 Nov 2019 || 59 || align=left | Disc.: NEAT || 
|- id="2002 PD194" bgcolor=#E9E9E9
| 0 ||  || MBA-M || 17.68 || 1.6 km || multiple || 2002–2022 || 26 Jan 2022 || 132 || align=left | Disc.: NEAT || 
|- id="2002 PF194" bgcolor=#d6d6d6
| 0 ||  || MBA-O || 16.2 || 3.2 km || multiple || 2002–2021 || 17 Jan 2021 || 121 || align=left | Disc.: NEAT || 
|- id="2002 PH194" bgcolor=#E9E9E9
| 0 ||  || MBA-M || 17.27 || 1.0 km || multiple || 2002–2021 || 06 Apr 2021 || 119 || align=left | Disc.: AMOSAlt.: 2006 QJ1 || 
|- id="2002 PK194" bgcolor=#E9E9E9
| 1 ||  || MBA-M || 17.4 || data-sort-value="0.98" | 980 m || multiple || 2002–2017 || 28 Mar 2017 || 56 || align=left | Disc.: AMOS || 
|- id="2002 PO194" bgcolor=#E9E9E9
| 0 ||  || MBA-M || 16.08 || 1.8 km || multiple || 2002–2021 || 17 May 2021 || 273 || align=left | Disc.: NEATAlt.: 2010 KP70 || 
|- id="2002 PQ194" bgcolor=#E9E9E9
| 0 ||  || MBA-M || 16.59 || 2.0 km || multiple || 1997–2022 || 27 Jan 2022 || 269 || align=left | Disc.: NEATAlt.: 2005 CU30 || 
|- id="2002 PU194" bgcolor=#d6d6d6
| 0 ||  || MBA-O || 16.75 || 2.5 km || multiple || 1991–2022 || 27 Jan 2022 || 109 || align=left | Disc.: NEATAlt.: 2008 SC42 || 
|- id="2002 PW194" bgcolor=#d6d6d6
| 0 ||  || MBA-O || 16.39 || 2.9 km || multiple || 2002–2021 || 13 Dec 2021 || 128 || align=left | Disc.: NEATAlt.: 2010 BZ115, 2014 QO186 || 
|- id="2002 PX194" bgcolor=#d6d6d6
| 0 ||  || MBA-O || 16.3 || 3.1 km || multiple || 2001–2020 || 15 Feb 2020 || 90 || align=left | Disc.: NEAT || 
|- id="2002 PY194" bgcolor=#fefefe
| 0 ||  || MBA-I || 18.1 || data-sort-value="0.71" | 710 m || multiple || 2002–2017 || 20 Jun 2017 || 74 || align=left | Disc.: NEATAlt.: 2010 TW33 || 
|- id="2002 PC195" bgcolor=#fefefe
| 1 ||  || MBA-I || 18.7 || data-sort-value="0.54" | 540 m || multiple || 2002–2020 || 13 Sep 2020 || 41 || align=left | Disc.: NEATAdded on 19 October 2020 || 
|- id="2002 PD195" bgcolor=#fefefe
| 2 ||  || MBA-I || 18.7 || data-sort-value="0.54" | 540 m || multiple || 2002–2012 || 14 Oct 2012 || 60 || align=left | Disc.: NEATAlt.: 2009 WA190 || 
|- id="2002 PH195" bgcolor=#d6d6d6
| 0 ||  || MBA-O || 15.58 || 4.3 km || multiple || 2002–2022 || 27 Jan 2022 || 242 || align=left | Disc.: NEATAlt.: 2011 ET46 || 
|- id="2002 PL195" bgcolor=#fefefe
| 1 ||  || MBA-I || 18.8 || data-sort-value="0.52" | 520 m || multiple || 2002–2020 || 16 Oct 2020 || 54 || align=left | Disc.: NEAT || 
|- id="2002 PN195" bgcolor=#E9E9E9
| 0 ||  || MBA-M || 16.5 || 1.5 km || multiple || 2002–2021 || 18 Jan 2021 || 330 || align=left | Disc.: NEAT || 
|- id="2002 PP195" bgcolor=#d6d6d6
| 1 ||  || MBA-O || 16.6 || 2.7 km || multiple || 2002–2018 || 09 Jul 2018 || 30 || align=left | Disc.: NEAT || 
|- id="2002 PQ195" bgcolor=#E9E9E9
| 0 ||  || MBA-M || 18.2 || data-sort-value="0.68" | 680 m || multiple || 2002–2019 || 19 Nov 2019 || 69 || align=left | Disc.: NEAT || 
|- id="2002 PR195" bgcolor=#E9E9E9
| 0 ||  || MBA-M || 17.8 || 1.2 km || multiple || 1998–2020 || 24 Dec 2020 || 97 || align=left | Disc.: NEAT || 
|- id="2002 PX195" bgcolor=#d6d6d6
| 0 ||  || MBA-O || 16.63 || 2.6 km || multiple || 2002–2022 || 25 Jan 2022 || 107 || align=left | Disc.: NEAT || 
|- id="2002 PZ195" bgcolor=#fefefe
| 0 ||  || MBA-I || 17.9 || data-sort-value="0.78" | 780 m || multiple || 2002–2021 || 18 Jan 2021 || 128 || align=left | Disc.: NEAT || 
|- id="2002 PH196" bgcolor=#E9E9E9
| 0 ||  || MBA-M || 17.5 || 1.8 km || multiple || 2002–2021 || 09 Dec 2021 || 74 || align=left | Disc.: NEATAdded on 29 January 2022 || 
|- id="2002 PJ196" bgcolor=#fefefe
| 3 ||  || MBA-I || 19.4 || data-sort-value="0.39" | 390 m || multiple || 2002–2019 || 15 May 2019 || 30 || align=left | Disc.: NEAT || 
|- id="2002 PL196" bgcolor=#d6d6d6
| 0 ||  || MBA-O || 16.6 || 2.7 km || multiple || 2002–2019 || 04 Nov 2019 || 72 || align=left | Disc.: NEATAlt.: 2008 UE232 || 
|- id="2002 PN196" bgcolor=#fefefe
| 0 ||  || MBA-I || 18.3 || data-sort-value="0.65" | 650 m || multiple || 2002–2020 || 06 Dec 2020 || 74 || align=left | Disc.: NEAT || 
|- id="2002 PO196" bgcolor=#E9E9E9
| 0 ||  || MBA-M || 17.8 || 1.2 km || multiple || 2002–2019 || 08 Jul 2019 || 82 || align=left | Disc.: NEAT || 
|- id="2002 PP196" bgcolor=#E9E9E9
| 0 ||  || MBA-M || 17.84 || data-sort-value="0.80" | 800 m || multiple || 2002–2021 || 15 Apr 2021 || 37 || align=left | Disc.: NEAT || 
|- id="2002 PS196" bgcolor=#E9E9E9
| 0 ||  || MBA-M || 18.11 || data-sort-value="0.71" | 710 m || multiple || 2002–2021 || 17 Apr 2021 || 34 || align=left | Disc.: NEATAlt.: 2014 NT13 || 
|- id="2002 PT196" bgcolor=#d6d6d6
| 0 ||  || MBA-O || 15.6 || 4.2 km || multiple || 2001–2021 || 17 Jan 2021 || 264 || align=left | Disc.: AMOS || 
|- id="2002 PV196" bgcolor=#d6d6d6
| 0 ||  || MBA-O || 16.4 || 2.9 km || multiple || 2001–2019 || 26 Nov 2019 || 99 || align=left | Disc.: NEATAlt.: 2012 LF14 || 
|- id="2002 PW196" bgcolor=#E9E9E9
| 0 ||  || MBA-M || 17.17 || 2.0 km || multiple || 2002–2021 || 14 Nov 2021 || 201 || align=left | Disc.: NEATAlt.: 2007 RH262 || 
|- id="2002 PX196" bgcolor=#E9E9E9
| 0 ||  || MBA-M || 17.57 || 1.7 km || multiple || 1998–2021 || 09 Nov 2021 || 127 || align=left | Disc.: NEAT || 
|- id="2002 PY196" bgcolor=#fefefe
| 3 ||  || MBA-I || 19.2 || data-sort-value="0.43" | 430 m || multiple || 2002–2018 || 13 Sep 2018 || 39 || align=left | Disc.: NEAT || 
|- id="2002 PA197" bgcolor=#d6d6d6
| 0 ||  || MBA-O || 16.4 || 2.9 km || multiple || 2002–2020 || 16 Dec 2020 || 75 || align=left | Disc.: NEAT || 
|- id="2002 PE197" bgcolor=#fefefe
| 0 ||  || MBA-I || 18.14 || data-sort-value="0.70" | 700 m || multiple || 1999–2022 || 25 Jan 2022 || 122 || align=left | Disc.: NEATAlt.: 2006 UB25, 2008 CE67 || 
|- id="2002 PH197" bgcolor=#fefefe
| 0 ||  || MBA-I || 18.3 || data-sort-value="0.65" | 650 m || multiple || 2002–2019 || 20 Dec 2019 || 70 || align=left | Disc.: NEATAlt.: 2009 WP134 || 
|- id="2002 PN197" bgcolor=#E9E9E9
| 0 ||  || MBA-M || 17.7 || 1.6 km || multiple || 2002–2020 || 13 Sep 2020 || 72 || align=left | Disc.: NEATAlt.: 2011 PJ21 || 
|- id="2002 PR197" bgcolor=#E9E9E9
| 0 ||  || MBA-M || 18.09 || 1.3 km || multiple || 2002–2021 || 11 Nov 2021 || 85 || align=left | Disc.: NEATAlt.: 2016 QA53 || 
|- id="2002 PT197" bgcolor=#fefefe
| 0 ||  || MBA-I || 18.22 || data-sort-value="0.67" | 670 m || multiple || 2002–2021 || 28 Jul 2021 || 75 || align=left | Disc.: NEAT || 
|- id="2002 PY197" bgcolor=#fefefe
| 1 ||  || MBA-I || 18.1 || data-sort-value="0.71" | 710 m || multiple || 2002–2021 || 14 Jan 2021 || 130 || align=left | Disc.: NEAT || 
|- id="2002 PZ197" bgcolor=#E9E9E9
| 0 ||  || MBA-M || 17.1 || 1.6 km || multiple || 2002–2021 || 16 Jan 2021 || 182 || align=left | Disc.: NEAT || 
|- id="2002 PB198" bgcolor=#d6d6d6
| 0 ||  || HIL || 15.56 || 4.5 km || multiple || 2002–2021 || 11 Feb 2021 || 158 || align=left | Disc.: NEATAlt.: 2010 LM37 || 
|- id="2002 PC198" bgcolor=#E9E9E9
| 0 ||  || MBA-M || 17.3 || 1.5 km || multiple || 2000–2021 || 04 Jan 2021 || 154 || align=left | Disc.: NEAT || 
|- id="2002 PE198" bgcolor=#fefefe
| 0 ||  || HUN || 18.71 || data-sort-value="0.54" | 540 m || multiple || 2001–2021 || 10 Aug 2021 || 72 || align=left | Disc.: NEAT || 
|- id="2002 PG198" bgcolor=#E9E9E9
| 0 ||  || MBA-M || 16.8 || 1.8 km || multiple || 2002–2021 || 07 Jan 2021 || 162 || align=left | Disc.: NEATAlt.: 2015 TJ322 || 
|- id="2002 PH198" bgcolor=#fefefe
| 0 ||  || MBA-I || 17.8 || data-sort-value="0.82" | 820 m || multiple || 2002–2020 || 13 Jun 2020 || 102 || align=left | Disc.: NEATAlt.: 2006 SM408 || 
|- id="2002 PN198" bgcolor=#fefefe
| 0 ||  || MBA-I || 18.0 || data-sort-value="0.75" | 750 m || multiple || 2002–2020 || 12 Dec 2020 || 127 || align=left | Disc.: NEAT || 
|- id="2002 PO198" bgcolor=#E9E9E9
| 0 ||  || MBA-M || 17.2 || 1.5 km || multiple || 2002–2019 || 25 Oct 2019 || 80 || align=left | Disc.: NEAT || 
|- id="2002 PP198" bgcolor=#E9E9E9
| 0 ||  || MBA-M || 17.4 || 2.8 km || multiple || 2002–2017 || 04 Jan 2017 || 91 || align=left | Disc.: NEATAlt.: 2010 OD92 || 
|- id="2002 PQ198" bgcolor=#fefefe
| 1 ||  || MBA-I || 17.87 || data-sort-value="0.79" | 790 m || multiple || 2002–2021 || 31 Jul 2021 || 38 || align=left | Disc.: NEAT || 
|- id="2002 PR198" bgcolor=#E9E9E9
| 0 ||  || MBA-M || 17.9 || 1.5 km || multiple || 2002–2020 || 12 Dec 2020 || 129 || align=left | Disc.: NEATAlt.: 2011 QQ46 || 
|- id="2002 PS198" bgcolor=#E9E9E9
| 0 ||  || MBA-M || 17.1 || 1.1 km || multiple || 2002–2021 || 07 Jan 2021 || 134 || align=left | Disc.: NEATAlt.: 2011 UL252 || 
|- id="2002 PU198" bgcolor=#E9E9E9
| 0 ||  || MBA-M || 17.16 || 2.1 km || multiple || 2002–2021 || 30 Nov 2021 || 85 || align=left | Disc.: NEAT || 
|- id="2002 PV198" bgcolor=#d6d6d6
| 0 ||  || MBA-O || 17.2 || 2.0 km || multiple || 2002–2018 || 12 Oct 2018 || 59 || align=left | Disc.: NEAT || 
|- id="2002 PW198" bgcolor=#E9E9E9
| 0 ||  || MBA-M || 17.3 || 1.0 km || multiple || 2002–2020 || 14 Dec 2020 || 55 || align=left | Disc.: NEATAdded on 17 June 2021Alt.: 2018 NX4, 2019 UM59 || 
|- id="2002 PA199" bgcolor=#E9E9E9
| 0 ||  || MBA-M || 17.4 || 1.8 km || multiple || 2000–2020 || 19 Oct 2020 || 89 || align=left | Disc.: NEATAlt.: 2011 QX7 || 
|- id="2002 PB199" bgcolor=#d6d6d6
| 0 ||  || MBA-O || 16.4 || 2.9 km || multiple || 2000–2020 || 17 May 2020 || 149 || align=left | Disc.: NEATAlt.: 2015 FV176 || 
|- id="2002 PD199" bgcolor=#E9E9E9
| 1 ||  || MBA-M || 18.2 || data-sort-value="0.96" | 960 m || multiple || 2002–2019 || 06 Jul 2019 || 35 || align=left | Disc.: NEAT || 
|- id="2002 PF199" bgcolor=#d6d6d6
| – ||  || MBA-O || 16.4 || 2.9 km || single || 22 days || 29 Aug 2002 || 12 || align=left | Disc.: NEAT || 
|- id="2002 PH199" bgcolor=#E9E9E9
| 0 ||  || MBA-M || 18.0 || 1.1 km || multiple || 2002–2020 || 07 Dec 2020 || 165 || align=left | Disc.: NEATAlt.: 2010 JE46, 2011 UT227 || 
|- id="2002 PJ199" bgcolor=#fefefe
| 0 ||  || MBA-I || 19.12 || data-sort-value="0.45" | 450 m || multiple || 2002–2020 || 16 Oct 2020 || 33 || align=left | Disc.: NEAT || 
|- id="2002 PK199" bgcolor=#fefefe
| 1 ||  || MBA-I || 18.7 || data-sort-value="0.54" | 540 m || multiple || 2002–2017 || 09 Dec 2017 || 74 || align=left | Disc.: NEATAlt.: 2013 PU35 || 
|- id="2002 PL199" bgcolor=#d6d6d6
| 4 ||  || MBA-O || 17.4 || 1.8 km || multiple || 2002–2018 || 14 Nov 2018 || 29 || align=left | Disc.: NEAT || 
|- id="2002 PM199" bgcolor=#fefefe
| 2 ||  || MBA-I || 18.7 || data-sort-value="0.54" | 540 m || multiple || 2002–2017 || 21 May 2017 || 57 || align=left | Disc.: NEATAlt.: 2005 MA38 || 
|- id="2002 PP199" bgcolor=#d6d6d6
| 0 ||  || MBA-O || 16.4 || 2.9 km || multiple || 2002–2021 || 18 Jan 2021 || 88 || align=left | Disc.: NEAT || 
|- id="2002 PQ199" bgcolor=#E9E9E9
| 1 ||  || MBA-M || 17.6 || 1.7 km || multiple || 2002–2020 || 15 Dec 2020 || 175 || align=left | Disc.: NEAT || 
|- id="2002 PR199" bgcolor=#fefefe
| 0 ||  || MBA-I || 18.6 || data-sort-value="0.57" | 570 m || multiple || 2002–2020 || 25 Jan 2020 || 89 || align=left | Disc.: NEATAlt.: 2015 RZ141 || 
|- id="2002 PZ199" bgcolor=#fefefe
| 0 ||  || MBA-I || 17.8 || data-sort-value="0.82" | 820 m || multiple || 1998–2020 || 23 Sep 2020 || 150 || align=left | Disc.: NEATAlt.: 2005 EL117 || 
|- id="2002 PA200" bgcolor=#E9E9E9
| 0 ||  || MBA-M || 17.6 || data-sort-value="0.90" | 900 m || multiple || 2002–2019 || 05 Nov 2019 || 86 || align=left | Disc.: NEAT || 
|- id="2002 PB200" bgcolor=#d6d6d6
| 2 ||  || MBA-O || 18.4 || 1.2 km || multiple || 2002–2018 || 13 Aug 2018 || 33 || align=left | Disc.: NEATAlt.: 2018 MZ11 || 
|- id="2002 PC200" bgcolor=#fefefe
| 3 ||  || MBA-I || 19.2 || data-sort-value="0.43" | 430 m || multiple || 2002–2012 || 05 Oct 2012 || 29 || align=left | Disc.: NEAT || 
|- id="2002 PE200" bgcolor=#FA8072
| 0 ||  || MCA || 18.8 || data-sort-value="0.52" | 520 m || multiple || 2002–2019 || 19 Dec 2019 || 76 || align=left | Disc.: NEATAlt.: 2009 WA112 || 
|- id="2002 PF200" bgcolor=#fefefe
| 0 ||  || MBA-I || 18.1 || data-sort-value="0.71" | 710 m || multiple || 2002–2019 || 24 Nov 2019 || 85 || align=left | Disc.: NEATAlt.: 2009 UH125 || 
|- id="2002 PG200" bgcolor=#E9E9E9
| 0 ||  || MBA-M || 17.8 || 1.2 km || multiple || 2002–2019 || 28 Oct 2019 || 65 || align=left | Disc.: NEAT || 
|- id="2002 PK200" bgcolor=#d6d6d6
| 0 ||  || MBA-O || 16.9 || 2.3 km || multiple || 2002–2018 || 14 Aug 2018 || 81 || align=left | Disc.: NEATAlt.: 2008 UR290 || 
|- id="2002 PM200" bgcolor=#E9E9E9
| 0 ||  || MBA-M || 17.5 || 1.3 km || multiple || 2002–2019 || 03 Oct 2019 || 114 || align=left | Disc.: NEAT || 
|- id="2002 PN200" bgcolor=#d6d6d6
| 0 ||  || MBA-O || 16.31 || 3.0 km || multiple || 2002–2021 || 13 Apr 2021 || 284 || align=left | Disc.: NEAT || 
|- id="2002 PO200" bgcolor=#E9E9E9
| 0 ||  || MBA-M || 17.6 || 1.3 km || multiple || 2002–2019 || 07 Sep 2019 || 59 || align=left | Disc.: NEAT || 
|- id="2002 PS200" bgcolor=#E9E9E9
| 0 ||  || MBA-M || 17.5 || data-sort-value="0.94" | 940 m || multiple || 2002–2019 || 22 Oct 2019 || 91 || align=left | Disc.: NEAT || 
|- id="2002 PV200" bgcolor=#fefefe
| 1 ||  || MBA-I || 18.7 || data-sort-value="0.54" | 540 m || multiple || 1995–2020 || 24 Nov 2020 || 79 || align=left | Disc.: NEAT || 
|- id="2002 PW200" bgcolor=#fefefe
| 0 ||  || MBA-I || 18.2 || data-sort-value="0.68" | 680 m || multiple || 2002–2019 || 21 Oct 2019 || 69 || align=left | Disc.: NEAT || 
|- id="2002 PZ200" bgcolor=#fefefe
| 1 ||  || MBA-I || 18.4 || data-sort-value="0.62" | 620 m || multiple || 2002–2013 || 21 Oct 2013 || 130 || align=left | Disc.: NEAT || 
|- id="2002 PA201" bgcolor=#fefefe
| 1 ||  || MBA-I || 18.8 || data-sort-value="0.52" | 520 m || multiple || 2002–2020 || 20 Oct 2020 || 58 || align=left | Disc.: NEATAdded on 19 October 2020 || 
|- id="2002 PB201" bgcolor=#fefefe
| 0 ||  || MBA-I || 18.28 || data-sort-value="0.66" | 660 m || multiple || 2002–2022 || 25 Jan 2022 || 125 || align=left | Disc.: NEATAlt.: 2006 UA107 || 
|- id="2002 PD201" bgcolor=#d6d6d6
| – ||  || MBA-O || 17.9 || 1.5 km || single || 44 days || 29 Aug 2002 || 15 || align=left | Disc.: NEAT || 
|- id="2002 PF201" bgcolor=#FA8072
| 0 ||  || MCA || 18.6 || data-sort-value="0.57" | 570 m || multiple || 2002–2020 || 05 Nov 2020 || 63 || align=left | Disc.: NEAT || 
|- id="2002 PG201" bgcolor=#E9E9E9
| 1 ||  || MBA-M || 18.0 || data-sort-value="0.75" | 750 m || multiple || 2002–2018 || 15 Jun 2018 || 43 || align=left | Disc.: NEAT || 
|- id="2002 PH201" bgcolor=#E9E9E9
| – ||  || MBA-M || 18.3 || data-sort-value="0.65" | 650 m || single || 44 days || 27 Aug 2002 || 14 || align=left | Disc.: NEAT || 
|- id="2002 PK201" bgcolor=#E9E9E9
| 0 ||  || MBA-M || 17.8 || 1.2 km || multiple || 2002–2019 || 28 Aug 2019 || 38 || align=left | Disc.: NEAT || 
|- id="2002 PM201" bgcolor=#fefefe
| 1 ||  || MBA-I || 18.6 || data-sort-value="0.57" | 570 m || multiple || 2002–2020 || 16 May 2020 || 64 || align=left | Disc.: NEAT || 
|- id="2002 PN201" bgcolor=#fefefe
| 0 ||  || MBA-I || 17.7 || data-sort-value="0.86" | 860 m || multiple || 2002–2020 || 17 Nov 2020 || 91 || align=left | Disc.: NEAT || 
|- id="2002 PO201" bgcolor=#d6d6d6
| 1 ||  || MBA-O || 17.2 || 2.0 km || multiple || 2002–2020 || 27 Feb 2020 || 51 || align=left | Disc.: NEATAlt.: 2017 PA1 || 
|- id="2002 PV201" bgcolor=#E9E9E9
| – ||  || MBA-M || 18.6 || data-sort-value="0.80" | 800 m || single || 28 days || 11 Sep 2002 || 16 || align=left | Disc.: NEAT || 
|- id="2002 PZ201" bgcolor=#fefefe
| 2 ||  || MBA-I || 18.5 || data-sort-value="0.59" | 590 m || multiple || 2002–2020 || 23 Jan 2020 || 59 || align=left | Disc.: NEATAlt.: 2012 RL11 || 
|- id="2002 PA202" bgcolor=#fefefe
| 0 ||  || MBA-I || 18.3 || data-sort-value="0.65" | 650 m || multiple || 2002–2021 || 18 Jan 2021 || 116 || align=left | Disc.: NEAT || 
|- id="2002 PF202" bgcolor=#d6d6d6
| 0 ||  || MBA-O || 16.52 || 2.8 km || multiple || 2002–2021 || 15 Apr 2021 || 157 || align=left | Disc.: NEAT || 
|- id="2002 PG202" bgcolor=#E9E9E9
| 0 ||  || MBA-M || 17.23 || 1.1 km || multiple || 2002–2021 || 15 Apr 2021 || 139 || align=left | Disc.: NEATAlt.: 2011 YR64 || 
|- id="2002 PM202" bgcolor=#fefefe
| 0 ||  || MBA-I || 17.7 || data-sort-value="0.86" | 860 m || multiple || 2001–2021 || 06 Jan 2021 || 245 || align=left | Disc.: AMOSAlt.: 2013 WV88 || 
|- id="2002 PN202" bgcolor=#E9E9E9
| 0 ||  || MBA-M || 17.1 || 1.1 km || multiple || 2002–2020 || 26 Jan 2020 || 282 || align=left | Disc.: NEATAlt.: 2015 VQ113 || 
|- id="2002 PO202" bgcolor=#fefefe
| 0 ||  || MBA-I || 18.3 || data-sort-value="0.65" | 650 m || multiple || 2002–2021 || 05 Jan 2021 || 85 || align=left | Disc.: NEAT || 
|- id="2002 PQ202" bgcolor=#fefefe
| 0 ||  || MBA-I || 18.57 || data-sort-value="0.57" | 570 m || multiple || 2002–2021 || 07 Nov 2021 || 68 || align=left | Disc.: NEATAlt.: 2017 OV10 || 
|- id="2002 PT202" bgcolor=#E9E9E9
| 0 ||  || MBA-M || 17.13 || 1.1 km || multiple || 2002–2021 || 13 Apr 2021 || 103 || align=left | Disc.: NEATAlt.: 2015 XX87 || 
|- id="2002 PV202" bgcolor=#d6d6d6
| 0 ||  || MBA-O || 15.4 || 4.9 km || multiple || 2002–2020 || 04 Jan 2020 || 130 || align=left | Disc.: AMOSAlt.: 2010 MJ33 || 
|- id="2002 PW202" bgcolor=#d6d6d6
| 0 ||  || MBA-O || 16.6 || 2.7 km || multiple || 2002–2018 || 08 Sep 2018 || 57 || align=left | Disc.: AMOS || 
|- id="2002 PX202" bgcolor=#E9E9E9
| 0 ||  || MBA-M || 17.40 || data-sort-value="0.98" | 980 m || multiple || 2002–2021 || 08 May 2021 || 78 || align=left | Disc.: NEATAlt.: 2013 HS60 || 
|- id="2002 PY202" bgcolor=#E9E9E9
| 0 ||  || MBA-M || 17.1 || 2.1 km || multiple || 2002–2017 || 28 Jan 2017 || 231 || align=left | Disc.: NEATAlt.: 2014 FB61, 2016 TQ8 || 
|- id="2002 PZ202" bgcolor=#E9E9E9
| 0 ||  || MBA-M || 17.09 || 1.1 km || multiple || 2002–2021 || 13 Apr 2021 || 52 || align=left | Disc.: NEAT || 
|- id="2002 PA203" bgcolor=#E9E9E9
| 0 ||  || MBA-M || 17.5 || data-sort-value="0.94" | 940 m || multiple || 2002–2020 || 26 Jan 2020 || 83 || align=left | Disc.: NEATAlt.: 2008 BT37 || 
|- id="2002 PB203" bgcolor=#d6d6d6
| 0 ||  || MBA-O || 17.0 || 2.2 km || multiple || 2002–2017 || 17 Oct 2017 || 66 || align=left | Disc.: NEAT || 
|- id="2002 PC203" bgcolor=#E9E9E9
| 2 ||  || MBA-M || 16.8 || 1.3 km || multiple || 2002–2020 || 22 Dec 2020 || 33 || align=left | Disc.: NEAT || 
|- id="2002 PD203" bgcolor=#d6d6d6
| 0 ||  || MBA-O || 17.2 || 2.0 km || multiple || 2002–2018 || 10 Jul 2018 || 33 || align=left | Disc.: NEATAlt.: 2013 TR90 || 
|- id="2002 PE203" bgcolor=#E9E9E9
| 3 ||  || MBA-M || 17.8 || 1.2 km || multiple || 2002–2015 || 08 Oct 2015 || 44 || align=left | Disc.: NEAT || 
|- id="2002 PG203" bgcolor=#E9E9E9
| 3 ||  || MBA-M || 18.0 || data-sort-value="0.75" | 750 m || multiple || 2002–2019 || 20 Dec 2019 || 41 || align=left | Disc.: NEAT || 
|- id="2002 PH203" bgcolor=#E9E9E9
| 0 ||  || MBA-M || 16.74 || 1.3 km || multiple || 2002–2021 || 12 May 2021 || 159 || align=left | Disc.: NEATAlt.: 2006 QX149, 2011 YE61, 2014 NS43 || 
|- id="2002 PL203" bgcolor=#E9E9E9
| 1 ||  || MBA-M || 17.6 || 1.3 km || multiple || 2000–2019 || 27 Sep 2019 || 50 || align=left | Disc.: NEAT || 
|- id="2002 PN203" bgcolor=#d6d6d6
| 0 ||  || MBA-O || 16.49 || 4.1 km || multiple || 2002–2021 || 27 Oct 2021 || 158 || align=left | Disc.: NEATAlt.: 2010 BC93, 2014 MH45 || 
|- id="2002 PO203" bgcolor=#E9E9E9
| 0 ||  || MBA-M || 17.6 || 1.7 km || multiple || 2002–2021 || 12 Jan 2021 || 221 || align=left | Disc.: NEAT || 
|- id="2002 PP203" bgcolor=#E9E9E9
| 0 ||  || MBA-M || 17.7 || data-sort-value="0.86" | 860 m || multiple || 2002–2019 || 28 Dec 2019 || 67 || align=left | Disc.: AMOSAlt.: 2015 TD120 || 
|- id="2002 PQ203" bgcolor=#E9E9E9
| 1 ||  || MBA-M || 18.0 || data-sort-value="0.75" | 750 m || multiple || 2002–2020 || 05 Jan 2020 || 65 || align=left | Disc.: AMOS || 
|- id="2002 PS203" bgcolor=#fefefe
| 0 ||  || MBA-I || 17.8 || data-sort-value="0.82" | 820 m || multiple || 2002–2020 || 24 Dec 2020 || 96 || align=left | Disc.: AMOS || 
|- id="2002 PT203" bgcolor=#FA8072
| 3 ||  || MCA || 19.57 || data-sort-value="0.33" | 370 m || multiple || 2002-2022 || 29 Jul 2022 || 22 || align=left | Disc.: NEAT || 
|- id="2002 PV203" bgcolor=#fefefe
| 0 ||  || MBA-I || 18.39 || data-sort-value="0.62" | 620 m || multiple || 1992–2021 || 07 Apr 2021 || 112 || align=left | Disc.: NEAT || 
|- id="2002 PW203" bgcolor=#fefefe
| 0 ||  || MBA-I || 17.3 || 1.0 km || multiple || 2002–2021 || 05 Jan 2021 || 162 || align=left | Disc.: NEAT || 
|- id="2002 PX203" bgcolor=#fefefe
| 0 ||  || MBA-I || 17.9 || data-sort-value="0.78" | 780 m || multiple || 2002–2020 || 10 Dec 2020 || 107 || align=left | Disc.: NEAT || 
|- id="2002 PA204" bgcolor=#fefefe
| 0 ||  || MBA-I || 17.9 || data-sort-value="0.78" | 780 m || multiple || 2002–2020 || 08 Sep 2020 || 98 || align=left | Disc.: NEAT || 
|- id="2002 PC204" bgcolor=#d6d6d6
| 0 ||  || MBA-O || 16.4 || 2.9 km || multiple || 2002–2020 || 17 Dec 2020 || 75 || align=left | Disc.: NEAT || 
|- id="2002 PG204" bgcolor=#fefefe
| 1 ||  || MBA-I || 18.7 || data-sort-value="0.54" | 540 m || multiple || 2002–2019 || 03 Jul 2019 || 55 || align=left | Disc.: NEAT || 
|- id="2002 PH204" bgcolor=#d6d6d6
| 0 ||  || MBA-O || 16.4 || 2.9 km || multiple || 2002–2019 || 21 Oct 2019 || 68 || align=left | Disc.: Cerro Tololo || 
|- id="2002 PK204" bgcolor=#fefefe
| 0 ||  || MBA-I || 18.5 || data-sort-value="0.59" | 590 m || multiple || 2002–2019 || 25 Jul 2019 || 50 || align=left | Disc.: NEAT || 
|- id="2002 PL204" bgcolor=#E9E9E9
| 0 ||  || MBA-M || 17.5 || 1.3 km || multiple || 2002–2021 || 18 Jan 2021 || 90 || align=left | Disc.: NEAT || 
|- id="2002 PM204" bgcolor=#E9E9E9
| 0 ||  || MBA-M || 17.4 || data-sort-value="0.98" | 980 m || multiple || 2002–2021 || 18 Jan 2021 || 77 || align=left | Disc.: Cerro Tololo || 
|- id="2002 PN204" bgcolor=#fefefe
| 0 ||  || MBA-I || 18.75 || data-sort-value="0.53" | 530 m || multiple || 2002–2021 || 12 Sep 2021 || 73 || align=left | Disc.: LPL/Spacewatch II || 
|- id="2002 PO204" bgcolor=#d6d6d6
| 0 ||  || MBA-O || 16.2 || 3.2 km || multiple || 2002–2020 || 20 Nov 2020 || 68 || align=left | Disc.: LPL/Spacewatch IIAlt.: 2010 EA17 || 
|- id="2002 PQ204" bgcolor=#E9E9E9
| 0 ||  || MBA-M || 17.7 || 1.2 km || multiple || 2002–2020 || 18 Dec 2020 || 47 || align=left | Disc.: Cerro Tololo || 
|- id="2002 PR204" bgcolor=#fefefe
| 0 ||  || MBA-I || 18.31 || data-sort-value="0.65" | 650 m || multiple || 2002–2021 || 08 Sep 2021 || 69 || align=left | Disc.: NEAT || 
|- id="2002 PT204" bgcolor=#E9E9E9
| 1 ||  || MBA-M || 16.8 || 1.8 km || multiple || 2002–2021 || 18 Jan 2021 || 155 || align=left | Disc.: AMOSAlt.: 2019 TC34 || 
|- id="2002 PU204" bgcolor=#fefefe
| 4 ||  || MBA-I || 19.0 || data-sort-value="0.47" | 470 m || multiple || 2002–2018 || 23 Jan 2018 || 35 || align=left | Disc.: Cerro Tololo || 
|- id="2002 PW204" bgcolor=#fefefe
| 0 ||  || MBA-I || 18.4 || data-sort-value="0.62" | 620 m || multiple || 2002–2020 || 17 Sep 2020 || 52 || align=left | Disc.: Cerro Tololo || 
|- id="2002 PX204" bgcolor=#fefefe
| 0 ||  || MBA-I || 17.7 || data-sort-value="0.86" | 860 m || multiple || 2002–2020 || 23 Dec 2020 || 155 || align=left | Disc.: NEATAlt.: 2010 CA208, 2019 UT14 || 
|- id="2002 PY204" bgcolor=#fefefe
| 0 ||  || MBA-I || 17.9 || data-sort-value="0.78" | 780 m || multiple || 2002–2019 || 24 Oct 2019 || 73 || align=left | Disc.: NEAT || 
|- id="2002 PZ204" bgcolor=#fefefe
| 0 ||  || MBA-I || 18.0 || data-sort-value="0.75" | 750 m || multiple || 2002–2020 || 06 Dec 2020 || 159 || align=left | Disc.: NEAT || 
|- id="2002 PA205" bgcolor=#fefefe
| 0 ||  || MBA-I || 18.59 || data-sort-value="0.57" | 570 m || multiple || 2002–2021 || 09 Jul 2021 || 117 || align=left | Disc.: LPL/Spacewatch II || 
|- id="2002 PB205" bgcolor=#d6d6d6
| 0 ||  || MBA-O || 15.98 || 3.5 km || multiple || 2002–2022 || 06 Jan 2022 || 103 || align=left | Disc.: NEATAlt.: 2010 EX3 || 
|- id="2002 PC205" bgcolor=#E9E9E9
| 0 ||  || MBA-M || 17.41 || data-sort-value="0.98" | 980 m || multiple || 2002–2021 || 14 Apr 2021 || 123 || align=left | Disc.: NEAT || 
|- id="2002 PE205" bgcolor=#E9E9E9
| 0 ||  || MBA-M || 16.8 || 2.4 km || multiple || 2002–2020 || 08 Nov 2020 || 111 || align=left | Disc.: LPL/Spacewatch II || 
|- id="2002 PF205" bgcolor=#E9E9E9
| 0 ||  || MBA-M || 17.7 || data-sort-value="0.86" | 860 m || multiple || 2002–2021 || 12 Jan 2021 || 66 || align=left | Disc.: LPL/Spacewatch II || 
|- id="2002 PG205" bgcolor=#E9E9E9
| 0 ||  || MBA-M || 17.5 || data-sort-value="0.94" | 940 m || multiple || 2002–2020 || 21 Jan 2020 || 63 || align=left | Disc.: LONEOS || 
|- id="2002 PH205" bgcolor=#fefefe
| 0 ||  || MBA-I || 18.5 || data-sort-value="0.59" | 590 m || multiple || 1999–2019 || 21 Oct 2019 || 59 || align=left | Disc.: NEAT || 
|- id="2002 PJ205" bgcolor=#d6d6d6
| 0 ||  || MBA-O || 17.0 || 2.2 km || multiple || 2002–2020 || 23 Nov 2020 || 54 || align=left | Disc.: NEAT || 
|- id="2002 PK205" bgcolor=#E9E9E9
| 2 ||  || MBA-M || 17.3 || 1.0 km || multiple || 2002–2021 || 15 Jan 2021 || 42 || align=left | Disc.: NEAT || 
|- id="2002 PL205" bgcolor=#fefefe
| 0 ||  || MBA-I || 18.34 || data-sort-value="0.64" | 640 m || multiple || 2002–2021 || 06 Nov 2021 || 96 || align=left | Disc.: NEAT || 
|- id="2002 PM205" bgcolor=#d6d6d6
| 0 ||  || MBA-O || 17.18 || 2.0 km || multiple || 2002–2021 || 07 Apr 2021 || 37 || align=left | Disc.: LPL/Spacewatch II || 
|- id="2002 PN205" bgcolor=#E9E9E9
| 0 ||  || MBA-M || 16.83 || 1.8 km || multiple || 2002–2021 || 27 Dec 2021 || 98 || align=left | Disc.: NEATAlt.: 2010 NZ42 || 
|- id="2002 PO205" bgcolor=#d6d6d6
| 0 ||  || MBA-O || 15.7 || 4.0 km || multiple || 2002–2021 || 06 Jan 2021 || 169 || align=left | Disc.: NEATAlt.: 2010 CG264 || 
|- id="2002 PP205" bgcolor=#d6d6d6
| 0 ||  || MBA-O || 16.7 || 2.5 km || multiple || 2002–2019 || 26 Oct 2019 || 70 || align=left | Disc.: NEAT || 
|- id="2002 PQ205" bgcolor=#d6d6d6
| 0 ||  || MBA-O || 16.95 || 2.3 km || multiple || 2002–2022 || 25 Jan 2022 || 61 || align=left | Disc.: LPL/Spacewatch II || 
|- id="2002 PR205" bgcolor=#fefefe
| 0 ||  || MBA-I || 18.24 || data-sort-value="0.67" | 670 m || multiple || 2002–2018 || 06 Nov 2018 || 52 || align=left | Disc.: La Palma Obs.Alt.: 2010 LT157 || 
|- id="2002 PS205" bgcolor=#fefefe
| 0 ||  || MBA-I || 18.5 || data-sort-value="0.59" | 590 m || multiple || 2002–2019 || 07 Apr 2019 || 43 || align=left | Disc.: Cerro Tololo || 
|- id="2002 PT205" bgcolor=#d6d6d6
| 0 ||  || MBA-O || 17.0 || 2.2 km || multiple || 2002–2020 || 26 Jan 2020 || 31 || align=left | Disc.: LPL/Spacewatch II || 
|- id="2002 PU205" bgcolor=#E9E9E9
| 0 ||  || MBA-M || 17.6 || 1.7 km || multiple || 2002–2020 || 15 Oct 2020 || 50 || align=left | Disc.: LPL/Spacewatch II || 
|- id="2002 PV205" bgcolor=#fefefe
| 3 ||  || MBA-I || 19.2 || data-sort-value="0.43" | 430 m || multiple || 2002–2019 || 10 Jun 2019 || 28 || align=left | Disc.: Cerro Tololo || 
|- id="2002 PW205" bgcolor=#fefefe
| 0 ||  || MBA-I || 18.6 || data-sort-value="0.57" | 570 m || multiple || 2002–2019 || 25 Nov 2019 || 46 || align=left | Disc.: NEAT || 
|- id="2002 PX205" bgcolor=#d6d6d6
| 0 ||  || MBA-O || 16.67 || 2.6 km || multiple || 2002–2021 || 08 May 2021 || 96 || align=left | Disc.: NEAT || 
|- id="2002 PY205" bgcolor=#E9E9E9
| 0 ||  || MBA-M || 16.6 || 1.4 km || multiple || 2002–2021 || 21 Jan 2021 || 91 || align=left | Disc.: NEATAlt.: 2010 HD40 || 
|- id="2002 PZ205" bgcolor=#E9E9E9
| 0 ||  || MBA-M || 17.54 || data-sort-value="0.92" | 920 m || multiple || 2002–2021 || 07 Feb 2021 || 53 || align=left | Disc.: NEAT || 
|- id="2002 PA206" bgcolor=#E9E9E9
| 1 ||  || MBA-M || 17.5 || data-sort-value="0.94" | 940 m || multiple || 2002–2019 || 19 Dec 2019 || 40 || align=left | Disc.: NEAT || 
|- id="2002 PB206" bgcolor=#fefefe
| 2 ||  || MBA-I || 18.8 || data-sort-value="0.52" | 520 m || multiple || 2002–2019 || 04 Nov 2019 || 39 || align=left | Disc.: Cerro TololoAdded on 22 July 2020 || 
|- id="2002 PC206" bgcolor=#fefefe
| 1 ||  || MBA-I || 17.5 || data-sort-value="0.94" | 940 m || multiple || 2000–2020 || 04 Dec 2020 || 156 || align=left | Disc.: NEATAdded on 13 September 2020Alt.: 2014 BD63 || 
|- id="2002 PD206" bgcolor=#fefefe
| 0 ||  || MBA-I || 19.0 || data-sort-value="0.47" | 470 m || multiple || 2002–2020 || 17 Oct 2020 || 79 || align=left | Disc.: NEATAdded on 19 October 2020Alt.: 2002 PZ196 || 
|- id="2002 PE206" bgcolor=#E9E9E9
| 2 ||  || MBA-M || 18.7 || 1.0 km || multiple || 2002–2020 || 16 Nov 2020 || 53 || align=left | Disc.: NEATAdded on 17 January 2021 || 
|- id="2002 PF206" bgcolor=#fefefe
| 0 ||  || MBA-I || 18.3 || data-sort-value="0.65" | 650 m || multiple || 2002–2021 || 12 Jan 2021 || 88 || align=left | Disc.: LPL/Spacewatch IIAdded on 17 January 2021 || 
|- id="2002 PH206" bgcolor=#d6d6d6
| 0 ||  || MBA-O || 17.0 || 2.2 km || multiple || 2002–2020 || 24 Jan 2020 || 34 || align=left | Disc.: NEATAdded on 24 December 2021 || 
|}
back to top

References 
 

Lists of unnumbered minor planets